

567001–567100 

|-bgcolor=#E9E9E9
| 567001 ||  || — || September 16, 2009 || Mount Lemmon || Mount Lemmon Survey ||  || align=right | 1.8 km || 
|-id=002 bgcolor=#d6d6d6
| 567002 ||  || — || August 26, 2012 || Haleakala || Pan-STARRS ||  || align=right | 2.3 km || 
|-id=003 bgcolor=#E9E9E9
| 567003 ||  || — || September 10, 2013 || Haleakala || Pan-STARRS ||  || align=right | 1.6 km || 
|-id=004 bgcolor=#E9E9E9
| 567004 ||  || — || September 18, 2009 || Kitt Peak || Spacewatch ||  || align=right | 1.6 km || 
|-id=005 bgcolor=#E9E9E9
| 567005 ||  || — || October 28, 2005 || Mount Lemmon || Mount Lemmon Survey ||  || align=right | 1.8 km || 
|-id=006 bgcolor=#d6d6d6
| 567006 ||  || — || November 2, 2013 || Kitt Peak || Mount Lemmon Survey ||  || align=right | 1.8 km || 
|-id=007 bgcolor=#d6d6d6
| 567007 ||  || — || September 21, 2012 || Mount Lemmon || Mount Lemmon Survey ||  || align=right | 2.4 km || 
|-id=008 bgcolor=#E9E9E9
| 567008 ||  || — || September 10, 2013 || Haleakala || Pan-STARRS ||  || align=right | 1.8 km || 
|-id=009 bgcolor=#d6d6d6
| 567009 ||  || — || September 23, 2012 || Kitt Peak || Spacewatch ||  || align=right | 2.6 km || 
|-id=010 bgcolor=#E9E9E9
| 567010 ||  || — || March 7, 2011 || Piszkesteto || J. Kelemen ||  || align=right | 2.0 km || 
|-id=011 bgcolor=#E9E9E9
| 567011 ||  || — || October 25, 2009 || Kitt Peak || Spacewatch ||  || align=right | 2.0 km || 
|-id=012 bgcolor=#d6d6d6
| 567012 ||  || — || September 19, 1995 || Kitt Peak || Spacewatch ||  || align=right | 2.5 km || 
|-id=013 bgcolor=#E9E9E9
| 567013 ||  || — || October 5, 2004 || Kitt Peak || Spacewatch ||  || align=right | 2.1 km || 
|-id=014 bgcolor=#E9E9E9
| 567014 ||  || — || March 3, 2016 || Haleakala || Pan-STARRS ||  || align=right data-sort-value="0.90" | 900 m || 
|-id=015 bgcolor=#d6d6d6
| 567015 ||  || — || November 2, 2013 || Mount Lemmon || Mount Lemmon Survey ||  || align=right | 2.6 km || 
|-id=016 bgcolor=#E9E9E9
| 567016 ||  || — || November 4, 2005 || Kitt Peak || Spacewatch ||  || align=right | 1.4 km || 
|-id=017 bgcolor=#d6d6d6
| 567017 ||  || — || September 28, 2003 || Apache Point || SDSS Collaboration ||  || align=right | 1.7 km || 
|-id=018 bgcolor=#d6d6d6
| 567018 ||  || — || October 20, 2007 || Mount Lemmon || Mount Lemmon Survey ||  || align=right | 2.8 km || 
|-id=019 bgcolor=#d6d6d6
| 567019 ||  || — || April 15, 2010 || Kitt Peak || Spacewatch ||  || align=right | 2.7 km || 
|-id=020 bgcolor=#d6d6d6
| 567020 ||  || — || October 17, 2007 || Mount Lemmon || Mount Lemmon Survey ||  || align=right | 2.6 km || 
|-id=021 bgcolor=#d6d6d6
| 567021 ||  || — || November 4, 2005 || Kitt Peak || Spacewatch || 7:4 || align=right | 2.8 km || 
|-id=022 bgcolor=#d6d6d6
| 567022 ||  || — || May 25, 2006 || Mount Lemmon || Mount Lemmon Survey ||  || align=right | 2.5 km || 
|-id=023 bgcolor=#d6d6d6
| 567023 ||  || — || October 8, 2012 || Haleakala || Pan-STARRS ||  || align=right | 2.4 km || 
|-id=024 bgcolor=#E9E9E9
| 567024 ||  || — || February 8, 2011 || Mount Lemmon || Mount Lemmon Survey ||  || align=right data-sort-value="0.97" | 970 m || 
|-id=025 bgcolor=#d6d6d6
| 567025 ||  || — || March 17, 2016 || Haleakala || Pan-STARRS ||  || align=right | 2.9 km || 
|-id=026 bgcolor=#d6d6d6
| 567026 ||  || — || October 10, 2018 || Mount Lemmon || Mount Lemmon Survey ||  || align=right | 2.2 km || 
|-id=027 bgcolor=#d6d6d6
| 567027 ||  || — || October 18, 2012 || Haleakala || Pan-STARRS ||  || align=right | 2.2 km || 
|-id=028 bgcolor=#d6d6d6
| 567028 ||  || — || November 9, 2018 || Haleakala || Pan-STARRS 2 ||  || align=right | 2.8 km || 
|-id=029 bgcolor=#d6d6d6
| 567029 ||  || — || November 1, 2018 || Mount Lemmon || Mount Lemmon Survey ||  || align=right | 2.3 km || 
|-id=030 bgcolor=#d6d6d6
| 567030 ||  || — || November 6, 2018 || Haleakala || Pan-STARRS 2 ||  || align=right | 2.4 km || 
|-id=031 bgcolor=#d6d6d6
| 567031 ||  || — || October 11, 2007 || Kitt Peak || CSS ||  || align=right | 3.3 km || 
|-id=032 bgcolor=#fefefe
| 567032 ||  || — || June 25, 2015 || Haleakala || Pan-STARRS || H || align=right data-sort-value="0.53" | 530 m || 
|-id=033 bgcolor=#d6d6d6
| 567033 ||  || — || October 12, 2007 || Mount Lemmon || Mount Lemmon Survey ||  || align=right | 2.6 km || 
|-id=034 bgcolor=#d6d6d6
| 567034 ||  || — || October 8, 2007 || Mount Lemmon || Mount Lemmon Survey ||  || align=right | 2.1 km || 
|-id=035 bgcolor=#d6d6d6
| 567035 ||  || — || April 10, 2010 || Mount Lemmon || Mount Lemmon Survey ||  || align=right | 3.0 km || 
|-id=036 bgcolor=#E9E9E9
| 567036 ||  || — || January 31, 2006 || Mount Lemmon || Mount Lemmon Survey ||  || align=right | 1.6 km || 
|-id=037 bgcolor=#d6d6d6
| 567037 ||  || — || January 2, 2014 || Mount Lemmon || Mount Lemmon Survey ||  || align=right | 2.6 km || 
|-id=038 bgcolor=#E9E9E9
| 567038 ||  || — || November 13, 2010 || Kitt Peak || Spacewatch ||  || align=right | 1.2 km || 
|-id=039 bgcolor=#d6d6d6
| 567039 ||  || — || April 30, 2016 || Haleakala || Pan-STARRS ||  || align=right | 2.2 km || 
|-id=040 bgcolor=#d6d6d6
| 567040 ||  || — || January 23, 2015 || Haleakala || Pan-STARRS ||  || align=right | 2.3 km || 
|-id=041 bgcolor=#d6d6d6
| 567041 ||  || — || May 3, 2016 || Mount Lemmon || Mount Lemmon Survey ||  || align=right | 3.1 km || 
|-id=042 bgcolor=#E9E9E9
| 567042 ||  || — || November 26, 2000 || Kitt Peak || Spacewatch ||  || align=right | 2.6 km || 
|-id=043 bgcolor=#d6d6d6
| 567043 ||  || — || November 17, 2001 || Anderson Mesa || LONEOS ||  || align=right | 4.1 km || 
|-id=044 bgcolor=#d6d6d6
| 567044 ||  || — || August 28, 2005 || Siding Spring || SSS || 7:4 || align=right | 4.1 km || 
|-id=045 bgcolor=#d6d6d6
| 567045 ||  || — || May 24, 2011 || Mount Lemmon || Mount Lemmon Survey ||  || align=right | 3.0 km || 
|-id=046 bgcolor=#E9E9E9
| 567046 ||  || — || January 9, 2002 || Socorro || LINEAR ||  || align=right | 2.3 km || 
|-id=047 bgcolor=#E9E9E9
| 567047 ||  || — || May 16, 2005 || Kitt Peak || Spacewatch ||  || align=right data-sort-value="0.91" | 910 m || 
|-id=048 bgcolor=#d6d6d6
| 567048 ||  || — || October 20, 2007 || Catalina || CSS ||  || align=right | 2.7 km || 
|-id=049 bgcolor=#d6d6d6
| 567049 ||  || — || June 3, 2011 || Kitt Peak || Spacewatch ||  || align=right | 3.3 km || 
|-id=050 bgcolor=#d6d6d6
| 567050 ||  || — || February 28, 2009 || Kitt Peak || Spacewatch ||  || align=right | 2.5 km || 
|-id=051 bgcolor=#E9E9E9
| 567051 ||  || — || July 16, 2013 || Haleakala || Pan-STARRS ||  || align=right | 1.6 km || 
|-id=052 bgcolor=#d6d6d6
| 567052 ||  || — || February 8, 2008 || Kitt Peak || Spacewatch || Tj (2.99) || align=right | 3.5 km || 
|-id=053 bgcolor=#d6d6d6
| 567053 ||  || — || October 18, 2012 || Haleakala || Pan-STARRS ||  || align=right | 2.5 km || 
|-id=054 bgcolor=#E9E9E9
| 567054 ||  || — || August 5, 2005 || Palomar || NEAT ||  || align=right | 1.8 km || 
|-id=055 bgcolor=#d6d6d6
| 567055 ||  || — || December 3, 2013 || Oukaimeden || M. Ory ||  || align=right | 3.1 km || 
|-id=056 bgcolor=#E9E9E9
| 567056 ||  || — || September 16, 2009 || Catalina || CSS ||  || align=right | 1.6 km || 
|-id=057 bgcolor=#d6d6d6
| 567057 ||  || — || March 11, 2005 || Mount Lemmon || Mount Lemmon Survey ||  || align=right | 3.1 km || 
|-id=058 bgcolor=#d6d6d6
| 567058 ||  || — || January 23, 2012 || Oukaimeden || M. Ory || 3:2 || align=right | 5.2 km || 
|-id=059 bgcolor=#d6d6d6
| 567059 ||  || — || February 6, 2014 || Mount Lemmon || Mount Lemmon Survey ||  || align=right | 2.4 km || 
|-id=060 bgcolor=#d6d6d6
| 567060 ||  || — || October 19, 2012 || Mount Lemmon || Mount Lemmon Survey ||  || align=right | 2.9 km || 
|-id=061 bgcolor=#d6d6d6
| 567061 ||  || — || September 27, 2006 || Mount Lemmon || Mount Lemmon Survey ||  || align=right | 2.8 km || 
|-id=062 bgcolor=#d6d6d6
| 567062 ||  || — || February 9, 2008 || Mount Lemmon || Mount Lemmon Survey ||  || align=right | 2.5 km || 
|-id=063 bgcolor=#E9E9E9
| 567063 ||  || — || January 15, 2005 || Socorro || LINEAR ||  || align=right | 2.3 km || 
|-id=064 bgcolor=#d6d6d6
| 567064 ||  || — || October 14, 2001 || Kitt Peak || Spacewatch ||  || align=right | 2.9 km || 
|-id=065 bgcolor=#C2E0FF
| 567065 ||  || — || February 8, 2019 || Haleakala || Pan-STARRS || centaur || align=right | 27 km || 
|-id=066 bgcolor=#C2FFFF
| 567066 ||  || — || November 2, 2015 || Haleakala || Pan-STARRS || L5 || align=right | 8.0 km || 
|-id=067 bgcolor=#C2FFFF
| 567067 ||  || — || October 26, 2014 || Haleakala || Pan-STARRS || L5 || align=right | 9.7 km || 
|-id=068 bgcolor=#C2FFFF
| 567068 ||  || — || October 3, 2013 || Haleakala || Pan-STARRS || L5 || align=right | 7.0 km || 
|-id=069 bgcolor=#C2FFFF
| 567069 ||  || — || September 5, 2013 || Kitt Peak || Spacewatch || L5 || align=right | 7.4 km || 
|-id=070 bgcolor=#C7FF8F
| 567070 ||  || — || April 7, 2019 || Haleakala || Pan-STARRS || centaurcritical || align=right | 35 km || 
|-id=071 bgcolor=#C2FFFF
| 567071 ||  || — || May 2, 2009 || Mount Lemmon || Mount Lemmon Survey || L5 || align=right | 9.2 km || 
|-id=072 bgcolor=#fefefe
| 567072 ||  || — || May 3, 2014 || Haleakala || Pan-STARRS || H || align=right data-sort-value="0.66" | 660 m || 
|-id=073 bgcolor=#C2FFFF
| 567073 ||  || — || October 23, 2009 || Mount Lemmon || Mount Lemmon Survey || L4 || align=right | 10 km || 
|-id=074 bgcolor=#C2FFFF
| 567074 ||  || — || January 23, 2006 || Kitt Peak || Spacewatch || L5 || align=right | 10 km || 
|-id=075 bgcolor=#C2FFFF
| 567075 ||  || — || February 4, 2019 || Haleakala || Pan-STARRS || L5 || align=right | 7.2 km || 
|-id=076 bgcolor=#C2FFFF
| 567076 ||  || — || January 25, 2006 || Kitt Peak || Spacewatch || L5 || align=right | 7.1 km || 
|-id=077 bgcolor=#FFC2E0
| 567077 ||  || — || June 3, 2019 || Haleakala || Pan-STARRS || AMO || align=right data-sort-value="0.48" | 480 m || 
|-id=078 bgcolor=#C2FFFF
| 567078 ||  || — || April 15, 2008 || Mount Lemmon || Mount Lemmon Survey || L5 || align=right | 7.4 km || 
|-id=079 bgcolor=#fefefe
| 567079 ||  || — || February 14, 2016 || Haleakala || Pan-STARRS || H || align=right data-sort-value="0.52" | 520 m || 
|-id=080 bgcolor=#C2FFFF
| 567080 ||  || — || August 4, 2011 || Haleakala || Pan-STARRS || L5 || align=right | 8.7 km || 
|-id=081 bgcolor=#fefefe
| 567081 ||  || — || October 29, 2017 || Haleakala || Pan-STARRS || H || align=right data-sort-value="0.69" | 690 m || 
|-id=082 bgcolor=#E9E9E9
| 567082 ||  || — || July 25, 2006 || Mount Lemmon || Mount Lemmon Survey ||  || align=right | 1.6 km || 
|-id=083 bgcolor=#fefefe
| 567083 ||  || — || August 1, 2011 || Haleakala || Pan-STARRS || H || align=right data-sort-value="0.52" | 520 m || 
|-id=084 bgcolor=#d6d6d6
| 567084 ||  || — || July 9, 2013 || Haleakala || Pan-STARRS ||  || align=right | 3.5 km || 
|-id=085 bgcolor=#fefefe
| 567085 ||  || — || November 23, 2012 || Kitt Peak || Spacewatch || H || align=right data-sort-value="0.58" | 580 m || 
|-id=086 bgcolor=#E9E9E9
| 567086 ||  || — || August 12, 2019 || Haleakala || Pan-STARRS ||  || align=right | 1.6 km || 
|-id=087 bgcolor=#fefefe
| 567087 ||  || — || September 27, 2011 || Mount Lemmon || Mount Lemmon Survey || H || align=right data-sort-value="0.45" | 450 m || 
|-id=088 bgcolor=#d6d6d6
| 567088 ||  || — || January 8, 2016 || Haleakala || Pan-STARRS ||  || align=right | 2.9 km || 
|-id=089 bgcolor=#E9E9E9
| 567089 ||  || — || September 26, 2006 || Kitt Peak || Spacewatch ||  || align=right | 1.9 km || 
|-id=090 bgcolor=#fefefe
| 567090 ||  || — || September 5, 2019 || Mount Lemmon || Mount Lemmon Survey ||  || align=right data-sort-value="0.65" | 650 m || 
|-id=091 bgcolor=#fefefe
| 567091 ||  || — || February 20, 2014 || Mount Lemmon || Mount Lemmon Survey ||  || align=right data-sort-value="0.87" | 870 m || 
|-id=092 bgcolor=#FFC2E0
| 567092 ||  || — || September 19, 2019 || Haleakala || Pan-STARRS || AMO +1km || align=right | 1.0 km || 
|-id=093 bgcolor=#fefefe
| 567093 ||  || — || November 17, 2009 || Mount Lemmon || Mount Lemmon Survey ||  || align=right data-sort-value="0.67" | 670 m || 
|-id=094 bgcolor=#E9E9E9
| 567094 ||  || — || October 21, 2007 || Catalina || CSS ||  || align=right data-sort-value="0.85" | 850 m || 
|-id=095 bgcolor=#fefefe
| 567095 ||  || — || February 15, 2010 || Catalina || CSS || H || align=right data-sort-value="0.67" | 670 m || 
|-id=096 bgcolor=#fefefe
| 567096 ||  || — || December 1, 2014 || Haleakala || Pan-STARRS || H || align=right data-sort-value="0.63" | 630 m || 
|-id=097 bgcolor=#E9E9E9
| 567097 ||  || — || December 29, 2011 || Kitt Peak || Spacewatch ||  || align=right | 1.2 km || 
|-id=098 bgcolor=#E9E9E9
| 567098 ||  || — || September 29, 2005 || Kitt Peak || Spacewatch ||  || align=right | 1.5 km || 
|-id=099 bgcolor=#E9E9E9
| 567099 ||  || — || September 23, 2015 || Haleakala || Pan-STARRS ||  || align=right | 1.4 km || 
|-id=100 bgcolor=#fefefe
| 567100 ||  || — || September 23, 2008 || Kitt Peak || Spacewatch ||  || align=right data-sort-value="0.61" | 610 m || 
|}

567101–567200 

|-bgcolor=#E9E9E9
| 567101 ||  || — || September 21, 2001 || Kitt Peak || Spacewatch ||  || align=right | 1.6 km || 
|-id=102 bgcolor=#E9E9E9
| 567102 ||  || — || March 6, 2013 || Haleakala || Pan-STARRS ||  || align=right | 1.2 km || 
|-id=103 bgcolor=#E9E9E9
| 567103 ||  || — || October 19, 2006 || Kitt Peak || Spacewatch ||  || align=right | 1.1 km || 
|-id=104 bgcolor=#d6d6d6
| 567104 ||  || — || October 3, 2019 || Mount Lemmon || Mount Lemmon Survey ||  || align=right | 2.9 km || 
|-id=105 bgcolor=#E9E9E9
| 567105 ||  || — || April 20, 2009 || Kitt Peak || Spacewatch ||  || align=right | 1.5 km || 
|-id=106 bgcolor=#E9E9E9
| 567106 ||  || — || October 10, 2002 || Palomar || NEAT ||  || align=right | 1.4 km || 
|-id=107 bgcolor=#E9E9E9
| 567107 ||  || — || November 12, 2007 || Mount Lemmon || Mount Lemmon Survey ||  || align=right | 1.1 km || 
|-id=108 bgcolor=#E9E9E9
| 567108 ||  || — || April 11, 2013 || Mount Lemmon || Mount Lemmon Survey ||  || align=right | 2.0 km || 
|-id=109 bgcolor=#d6d6d6
| 567109 ||  || — || March 27, 2011 || Mount Lemmon || Mount Lemmon Survey ||  || align=right | 2.2 km || 
|-id=110 bgcolor=#fefefe
| 567110 ||  || — || March 12, 2010 || Catalina || CSS ||  || align=right data-sort-value="0.63" | 630 m || 
|-id=111 bgcolor=#E9E9E9
| 567111 ||  || — || October 11, 2010 || Mount Lemmon || Mount Lemmon Survey ||  || align=right | 1.6 km || 
|-id=112 bgcolor=#d6d6d6
| 567112 ||  || — || March 12, 2016 || Haleakala || Pan-STARRS ||  || align=right | 2.2 km || 
|-id=113 bgcolor=#fefefe
| 567113 ||  || — || January 4, 2013 || Kitt Peak || Spacewatch ||  || align=right data-sort-value="0.58" | 580 m || 
|-id=114 bgcolor=#d6d6d6
| 567114 ||  || — || January 7, 2014 || Mount Lemmon || Mount Lemmon Survey ||  || align=right | 3.2 km || 
|-id=115 bgcolor=#fefefe
| 567115 ||  || — || October 2, 2016 || Haleakala || Pan-STARRS ||  || align=right data-sort-value="0.71" | 710 m || 
|-id=116 bgcolor=#E9E9E9
| 567116 ||  || — || October 17, 2010 || Mount Lemmon || Mount Lemmon Survey ||  || align=right | 1.4 km || 
|-id=117 bgcolor=#d6d6d6
| 567117 ||  || — || December 2, 2008 || Kitt Peak || Spacewatch ||  || align=right | 1.7 km || 
|-id=118 bgcolor=#E9E9E9
| 567118 ||  || — || July 29, 2008 || Kitt Peak || Spacewatch ||  || align=right | 1.6 km || 
|-id=119 bgcolor=#C2FFFF
| 567119 ||  || — || October 8, 2015 || Haleakala || Pan-STARRS || L5 || align=right | 6.8 km || 
|-id=120 bgcolor=#C2FFFF
| 567120 ||  || — || April 21, 2020 || Mount Lemmon || Mount Lemmon Survey || L5 || align=right | 6.6 km || 
|-id=121 bgcolor=#C2FFFF
| 567121 ||  || — || April 28, 2020 || Haleakala || Pan-STARRS || L5 || align=right | 5.9 km || 
|-id=122 bgcolor=#C7FF8F
| 567122 ||  || — || August 13, 2020 || Haleakala || Pan-STARRS || centaur || align=right | 59 km || 
|-id=123 bgcolor=#fefefe
| 567123 ||  || — || January 8, 2010 || Kitt Peak || Spacewatch ||  || align=right data-sort-value="0.67" | 670 m || 
|-id=124 bgcolor=#d6d6d6
| 567124 ||  || — || February 25, 2007 || Kitt Peak || Spacewatch ||  || align=right | 1.6 km || 
|-id=125 bgcolor=#d6d6d6
| 567125 ||  || — || January 2, 2016 || Haleakala || Pan-STARRS ||  || align=right | 1.6 km || 
|-id=126 bgcolor=#E9E9E9
| 567126 ||  || — || December 5, 2007 || Kitt Peak || Spacewatch ||  || align=right | 1.4 km || 
|-id=127 bgcolor=#E9E9E9
| 567127 ||  || — || March 11, 2003 || Kitt Peak || Spacewatch ||  || align=right | 1.5 km || 
|-id=128 bgcolor=#fefefe
| 567128 ||  || — || April 26, 2007 || Mount Lemmon || Mount Lemmon Survey ||  || align=right data-sort-value="0.81" | 810 m || 
|-id=129 bgcolor=#C7FF8F
| 567129 ||  || — || February 7, 2021 || Mount Lemmon || Mount Lemmon Survey || centaur || align=right | 9.6 km || 
|-id=130 bgcolor=#d6d6d6
| 567130 ||  || — || March 10, 1999 || Kitt Peak || Spacewatch ||  || align=right | 1.9 km || 
|-id=131 bgcolor=#fefefe
| 567131 ||  || — || September 28, 2003 || Kitt Peak || Spacewatch ||  || align=right data-sort-value="0.48" | 480 m || 
|-id=132 bgcolor=#fefefe
| 567132 ||  || — || June 26, 2015 || Haleakala || Pan-STARRS ||  || align=right data-sort-value="0.54" | 540 m || 
|-id=133 bgcolor=#d6d6d6
| 567133 ||  || — || January 23, 2006 || Kitt Peak || Spacewatch ||  || align=right | 2.8 km || 
|-id=134 bgcolor=#E9E9E9
| 567134 ||  || — || December 30, 2013 || Mount Lemmon || Mount Lemmon Survey ||  || align=right | 1.7 km || 
|-id=135 bgcolor=#d6d6d6
| 567135 ||  || — || December 12, 1999 || Socorro || LINEAR || Tj (2.83) || align=right | 2.7 km || 
|-id=136 bgcolor=#E9E9E9
| 567136 ||  || — || January 18, 2009 || Kitt Peak || Spacewatch ||  || align=right | 2.0 km || 
|-id=137 bgcolor=#fefefe
| 567137 ||  || — || January 30, 2000 || Kitt Peak || Spacewatch ||  || align=right data-sort-value="0.57" | 570 m || 
|-id=138 bgcolor=#d6d6d6
| 567138 ||  || — || January 26, 2000 || Kitt Peak || Spacewatch ||  || align=right | 1.8 km || 
|-id=139 bgcolor=#d6d6d6
| 567139 ||  || — || February 14, 2000 || Kitt Peak || Spacewatch || 7:4 || align=right | 3.2 km || 
|-id=140 bgcolor=#fefefe
| 567140 ||  || — || February 2, 2000 || Kitt Peak || Spacewatch ||  || align=right data-sort-value="0.85" | 850 m || 
|-id=141 bgcolor=#fefefe
| 567141 ||  || — || February 4, 2000 || Kitt Peak || Spacewatch ||  || align=right data-sort-value="0.63" | 630 m || 
|-id=142 bgcolor=#fefefe
| 567142 ||  || — || February 5, 2000 || Kitt Peak || Spacewatch ||  || align=right data-sort-value="0.56" | 560 m || 
|-id=143 bgcolor=#E9E9E9
| 567143 ||  || — || October 7, 2016 || Mount Lemmon || Mount Lemmon Survey ||  || align=right | 1.8 km || 
|-id=144 bgcolor=#fefefe
| 567144 ||  || — || March 7, 2017 || Haleakala || Pan-STARRS ||  || align=right data-sort-value="0.65" | 650 m || 
|-id=145 bgcolor=#E9E9E9
| 567145 ||  || — || January 14, 2012 || Mount Lemmon || Mount Lemmon Survey ||  || align=right | 1.2 km || 
|-id=146 bgcolor=#fefefe
| 567146 ||  || — || January 10, 2007 || Mount Lemmon || Mount Lemmon Survey ||  || align=right data-sort-value="0.78" | 780 m || 
|-id=147 bgcolor=#d6d6d6
| 567147 ||  || — || November 28, 2013 || Mount Lemmon || Mount Lemmon Survey ||  || align=right | 2.3 km || 
|-id=148 bgcolor=#fefefe
| 567148 ||  || — || August 20, 2011 || Haleakala || Pan-STARRS ||  || align=right data-sort-value="0.60" | 600 m || 
|-id=149 bgcolor=#fefefe
| 567149 ||  || — || February 12, 2000 || Apache Point || SDSS Collaboration ||  || align=right data-sort-value="0.59" | 590 m || 
|-id=150 bgcolor=#d6d6d6
| 567150 ||  || — || March 3, 2000 || Kitt Peak || Spacewatch ||  || align=right | 1.9 km || 
|-id=151 bgcolor=#d6d6d6
| 567151 ||  || — || March 3, 2000 || Kitt Peak || Spacewatch ||  || align=right | 2.2 km || 
|-id=152 bgcolor=#fefefe
| 567152 ||  || — || March 3, 2000 || Socorro || LINEAR ||  || align=right data-sort-value="0.73" | 730 m || 
|-id=153 bgcolor=#d6d6d6
| 567153 ||  || — || April 4, 2005 || Mount Lemmon || Mount Lemmon Survey ||  || align=right | 2.1 km || 
|-id=154 bgcolor=#d6d6d6
| 567154 ||  || — || September 12, 2007 || Mount Lemmon || Mount Lemmon Survey ||  || align=right | 1.9 km || 
|-id=155 bgcolor=#fefefe
| 567155 ||  || — || September 23, 2008 || Mount Lemmon || Mount Lemmon Survey ||  || align=right data-sort-value="0.68" | 680 m || 
|-id=156 bgcolor=#fefefe
| 567156 ||  || — || April 5, 2014 || Haleakala || Pan-STARRS ||  || align=right data-sort-value="0.65" | 650 m || 
|-id=157 bgcolor=#fefefe
| 567157 ||  || — || July 25, 2011 || Haleakala || Pan-STARRS ||  || align=right data-sort-value="0.67" | 670 m || 
|-id=158 bgcolor=#d6d6d6
| 567158 ||  || — || December 3, 2015 || Haleakala || Pan-STARRS ||  || align=right | 2.5 km || 
|-id=159 bgcolor=#d6d6d6
| 567159 ||  || — || March 12, 2000 || Kitt Peak || Spacewatch ||  || align=right | 1.7 km || 
|-id=160 bgcolor=#E9E9E9
| 567160 ||  || — || March 29, 2000 || Kitt Peak || Spacewatch ||  || align=right data-sort-value="0.98" | 980 m || 
|-id=161 bgcolor=#E9E9E9
| 567161 ||  || — || February 26, 2004 || Kitt Peak || M. W. Buie, D. E. Trilling ||  || align=right data-sort-value="0.83" | 830 m || 
|-id=162 bgcolor=#FA8072
| 567162 ||  || — || April 2, 2000 || Anderson Mesa || LONEOS ||  || align=right data-sort-value="0.64" | 640 m || 
|-id=163 bgcolor=#fefefe
| 567163 ||  || — || October 18, 2009 || Mount Lemmon || Mount Lemmon Survey || H || align=right data-sort-value="0.62" | 620 m || 
|-id=164 bgcolor=#fefefe
| 567164 ||  || — || August 21, 2004 || Siding Spring || SSS ||  || align=right data-sort-value="0.74" | 740 m || 
|-id=165 bgcolor=#E9E9E9
| 567165 ||  || — || March 11, 2016 || Mount Lemmon || Mount Lemmon Survey ||  || align=right data-sort-value="0.64" | 640 m || 
|-id=166 bgcolor=#fefefe
| 567166 ||  || — || September 29, 2009 || Mount Lemmon || Mount Lemmon Survey || H || align=right data-sort-value="0.65" | 650 m || 
|-id=167 bgcolor=#fefefe
| 567167 ||  || — || May 2, 2000 || Kitt Peak || Spacewatch ||  || align=right data-sort-value="0.62" | 620 m || 
|-id=168 bgcolor=#fefefe
| 567168 ||  || — || February 3, 2017 || Haleakala || Pan-STARRS ||  || align=right data-sort-value="0.72" | 720 m || 
|-id=169 bgcolor=#fefefe
| 567169 ||  || — || May 28, 2000 || Socorro || LINEAR ||  || align=right data-sort-value="0.92" | 920 m || 
|-id=170 bgcolor=#E9E9E9
| 567170 ||  || — || May 28, 2000 || Socorro || LINEAR ||  || align=right | 1.3 km || 
|-id=171 bgcolor=#fefefe
| 567171 ||  || — || June 5, 2000 || Kitt Peak || Spacewatch ||  || align=right data-sort-value="0.52" | 520 m || 
|-id=172 bgcolor=#d6d6d6
| 567172 ||  || — || July 30, 2000 || Cerro Tololo || M. W. Buie, S. D. Kern ||  || align=right | 2.5 km || 
|-id=173 bgcolor=#d6d6d6
| 567173 ||  || — || December 31, 2007 || Mount Lemmon || Mount Lemmon Survey ||  || align=right | 2.3 km || 
|-id=174 bgcolor=#d6d6d6
| 567174 ||  || — || October 15, 2006 || Kitt Peak || Spacewatch ||  || align=right | 1.9 km || 
|-id=175 bgcolor=#E9E9E9
| 567175 ||  || — || July 29, 2000 || Cerro Tololo || M. W. Buie, S. D. Kern ||  || align=right data-sort-value="0.65" | 650 m || 
|-id=176 bgcolor=#E9E9E9
| 567176 ||  || — || March 27, 2012 || Mount Lemmon || Mount Lemmon Survey ||  || align=right | 1.0 km || 
|-id=177 bgcolor=#d6d6d6
| 567177 ||  || — || June 20, 2015 || Haleakala || Pan-STARRS ||  || align=right | 2.0 km || 
|-id=178 bgcolor=#d6d6d6
| 567178 ||  || — || May 21, 2015 || Haleakala || Pan-STARRS ||  || align=right | 2.3 km || 
|-id=179 bgcolor=#fefefe
| 567179 ||  || — || January 31, 2006 || Kitt Peak || Spacewatch ||  || align=right data-sort-value="0.53" | 530 m || 
|-id=180 bgcolor=#d6d6d6
| 567180 ||  || — || August 30, 2011 || Haleakala || Pan-STARRS ||  || align=right | 2.6 km || 
|-id=181 bgcolor=#d6d6d6
| 567181 ||  || — || August 3, 2000 || Kitt Peak || Spacewatch ||  || align=right | 2.3 km || 
|-id=182 bgcolor=#E9E9E9
| 567182 ||  || — || August 29, 2000 || La Silla || La Silla Obs. ||  || align=right | 1.5 km || 
|-id=183 bgcolor=#d6d6d6
| 567183 ||  || — || March 2, 2009 || Mount Lemmon || Mount Lemmon Survey ||  || align=right | 2.5 km || 
|-id=184 bgcolor=#d6d6d6
| 567184 ||  || — || October 16, 2011 || Kitt Peak || Spacewatch ||  || align=right | 2.7 km || 
|-id=185 bgcolor=#E9E9E9
| 567185 ||  || — || September 10, 2013 || Haleakala || Pan-STARRS ||  || align=right | 1.2 km || 
|-id=186 bgcolor=#E9E9E9
| 567186 ||  || — || August 25, 2000 || Cerro Tololo || R. Millis, L. H. Wasserman ||  || align=right | 1.2 km || 
|-id=187 bgcolor=#d6d6d6
| 567187 ||  || — || September 26, 2011 || Haleakala || Pan-STARRS ||  || align=right | 2.0 km || 
|-id=188 bgcolor=#d6d6d6
| 567188 ||  || — || March 21, 2015 || Haleakala || Pan-STARRS ||  || align=right | 2.8 km || 
|-id=189 bgcolor=#E9E9E9
| 567189 ||  || — || September 25, 2009 || Kitt Peak || Spacewatch ||  || align=right | 1.2 km || 
|-id=190 bgcolor=#d6d6d6
| 567190 ||  || — || October 6, 2011 || Mount Lemmon || Mount Lemmon Survey ||  || align=right | 2.5 km || 
|-id=191 bgcolor=#d6d6d6
| 567191 ||  || — || September 25, 2011 || Haleakala || Pan-STARRS ||  || align=right | 2.6 km || 
|-id=192 bgcolor=#E9E9E9
| 567192 ||  || — || September 1, 2000 || Socorro || LINEAR ||  || align=right | 1.2 km || 
|-id=193 bgcolor=#E9E9E9
| 567193 ||  || — || September 4, 2000 || Kitt Peak || Spacewatch ||  || align=right data-sort-value="0.84" | 840 m || 
|-id=194 bgcolor=#fefefe
| 567194 ||  || — || November 3, 2007 || Mount Lemmon || Mount Lemmon Survey ||  || align=right data-sort-value="0.65" | 650 m || 
|-id=195 bgcolor=#d6d6d6
| 567195 ||  || — || September 24, 2011 || Haleakala || Pan-STARRS ||  || align=right | 2.5 km || 
|-id=196 bgcolor=#E9E9E9
| 567196 ||  || — || July 17, 2004 || Cerro Tololo || Cerro Tololo Obs. ||  || align=right data-sort-value="0.71" | 710 m || 
|-id=197 bgcolor=#E9E9E9
| 567197 ||  || — || August 13, 2004 || Cerro Tololo || Cerro Tololo Obs. ||  || align=right data-sort-value="0.98" | 980 m || 
|-id=198 bgcolor=#d6d6d6
| 567198 ||  || — || October 23, 2006 || Kitt Peak || Spacewatch ||  || align=right | 2.0 km || 
|-id=199 bgcolor=#d6d6d6
| 567199 ||  || — || September 8, 2000 || Kitt Peak || Spacewatch ||  || align=right | 2.3 km || 
|-id=200 bgcolor=#fefefe
| 567200 ||  || — || September 8, 2000 || Kitt Peak || Spacewatch ||  || align=right data-sort-value="0.57" | 570 m || 
|}

567201–567300 

|-bgcolor=#fefefe
| 567201 ||  || — || September 19, 2000 || Kitt Peak || Spacewatch ||  || align=right data-sort-value="0.66" | 660 m || 
|-id=202 bgcolor=#E9E9E9
| 567202 ||  || — || September 21, 2000 || Haleakala || AMOS ||  || align=right | 1.9 km || 
|-id=203 bgcolor=#d6d6d6
| 567203 ||  || — || September 24, 2000 || Socorro || LINEAR ||  || align=right | 3.1 km || 
|-id=204 bgcolor=#E9E9E9
| 567204 ||  || — || August 5, 2000 || Haleakala || AMOS ||  || align=right | 1.1 km || 
|-id=205 bgcolor=#d6d6d6
| 567205 ||  || — || September 23, 2000 || Socorro || LINEAR ||  || align=right | 2.4 km || 
|-id=206 bgcolor=#fefefe
| 567206 ||  || — || September 27, 2000 || Kitt Peak || Spacewatch ||  || align=right data-sort-value="0.80" | 800 m || 
|-id=207 bgcolor=#d6d6d6
| 567207 ||  || — || September 24, 2000 || Kitt Peak || Spacewatch ||  || align=right | 2.3 km || 
|-id=208 bgcolor=#d6d6d6
| 567208 ||  || — || September 23, 2000 || Socorro || LINEAR ||  || align=right | 2.9 km || 
|-id=209 bgcolor=#E9E9E9
| 567209 ||  || — || September 23, 2000 || Socorro || LINEAR ||  || align=right | 1.7 km || 
|-id=210 bgcolor=#d6d6d6
| 567210 ||  || — || September 25, 2000 || Kitt Peak || Spacewatch ||  || align=right | 2.2 km || 
|-id=211 bgcolor=#FA8072
| 567211 ||  || — || September 24, 2000 || Anderson Mesa || LONEOS ||  || align=right data-sort-value="0.58" | 580 m || 
|-id=212 bgcolor=#d6d6d6
| 567212 ||  || — || September 29, 2000 || Kitt Peak || Spacewatch ||  || align=right | 2.7 km || 
|-id=213 bgcolor=#E9E9E9
| 567213 ||  || — || October 14, 2004 || Kitt Peak || Spacewatch ||  || align=right | 1.4 km || 
|-id=214 bgcolor=#d6d6d6
| 567214 ||  || — || October 19, 2011 || Haleakala || Pan-STARRS ||  || align=right | 3.0 km || 
|-id=215 bgcolor=#fefefe
| 567215 ||  || — || April 8, 2006 || Kitt Peak || Spacewatch ||  || align=right data-sort-value="0.65" | 650 m || 
|-id=216 bgcolor=#E9E9E9
| 567216 ||  || — || November 11, 2013 || Kitt Peak || Spacewatch ||  || align=right | 1.3 km || 
|-id=217 bgcolor=#d6d6d6
| 567217 ||  || — || April 19, 2009 || Mount Lemmon || Mount Lemmon Survey ||  || align=right | 2.5 km || 
|-id=218 bgcolor=#C2FFFF
| 567218 ||  || — || July 28, 2011 || Haleakala || Pan-STARRS || L5 || align=right | 7.0 km || 
|-id=219 bgcolor=#fefefe
| 567219 ||  || — || May 1, 2006 || Kitt Peak || Spacewatch ||  || align=right data-sort-value="0.57" | 570 m || 
|-id=220 bgcolor=#d6d6d6
| 567220 ||  || — || February 28, 2014 || Haleakala || Pan-STARRS ||  || align=right | 2.4 km || 
|-id=221 bgcolor=#d6d6d6
| 567221 ||  || — || December 11, 2010 || Kitt Peak || Spacewatch || 3:2 || align=right | 4.4 km || 
|-id=222 bgcolor=#E9E9E9
| 567222 ||  || — || June 17, 2004 || Kitt Peak || Spacewatch ||  || align=right | 1.4 km || 
|-id=223 bgcolor=#d6d6d6
| 567223 ||  || — || November 1, 2006 || Mount Lemmon || Mount Lemmon Survey ||  || align=right | 2.5 km || 
|-id=224 bgcolor=#fefefe
| 567224 ||  || — || April 11, 2003 || Kitt Peak || Spacewatch ||  || align=right data-sort-value="0.66" | 660 m || 
|-id=225 bgcolor=#d6d6d6
| 567225 ||  || — || September 23, 2011 || Kitt Peak || Spacewatch ||  || align=right | 3.2 km || 
|-id=226 bgcolor=#d6d6d6
| 567226 ||  || — || March 12, 2014 || Mount Lemmon || Mount Lemmon Survey ||  || align=right | 2.5 km || 
|-id=227 bgcolor=#E9E9E9
| 567227 ||  || — || November 1, 2013 || Haleakala || Pan-STARRS ||  || align=right | 1.3 km || 
|-id=228 bgcolor=#E9E9E9
| 567228 ||  || — || August 22, 2004 || Siding Spring || SSS ||  || align=right | 1.3 km || 
|-id=229 bgcolor=#d6d6d6
| 567229 ||  || — || September 15, 2006 || Kitt Peak || Spacewatch ||  || align=right | 2.6 km || 
|-id=230 bgcolor=#E9E9E9
| 567230 ||  || — || March 14, 2011 || Mount Lemmon || Mount Lemmon Survey ||  || align=right | 1.2 km || 
|-id=231 bgcolor=#d6d6d6
| 567231 ||  || — || August 15, 2017 || Haleakala || Pan-STARRS ||  || align=right | 3.5 km || 
|-id=232 bgcolor=#E9E9E9
| 567232 ||  || — || January 26, 2006 || Mount Lemmon || Mount Lemmon Survey ||  || align=right | 1.1 km || 
|-id=233 bgcolor=#E9E9E9
| 567233 ||  || — || June 8, 2012 || Mount Lemmon || Mount Lemmon Survey ||  || align=right | 1.3 km || 
|-id=234 bgcolor=#d6d6d6
| 567234 ||  || — || September 26, 2000 || Apache Point || SDSS Collaboration ||  || align=right | 2.7 km || 
|-id=235 bgcolor=#fefefe
| 567235 ||  || — || September 21, 2000 || Kitt Peak || Spacewatch ||  || align=right data-sort-value="0.55" | 550 m || 
|-id=236 bgcolor=#d6d6d6
| 567236 ||  || — || December 18, 2007 || Mount Lemmon || Mount Lemmon Survey ||  || align=right | 2.5 km || 
|-id=237 bgcolor=#E9E9E9
| 567237 ||  || — || November 16, 2009 || Mount Lemmon || Mount Lemmon Survey ||  || align=right | 1.5 km || 
|-id=238 bgcolor=#d6d6d6
| 567238 ||  || — || September 12, 2016 || Mount Lemmon || Mount Lemmon Survey ||  || align=right | 2.9 km || 
|-id=239 bgcolor=#E9E9E9
| 567239 ||  || — || May 27, 2012 || Mount Lemmon || Mount Lemmon Survey ||  || align=right | 1.1 km || 
|-id=240 bgcolor=#d6d6d6
| 567240 ||  || — || September 24, 2000 || Kitt Peak || Spacewatch ||  || align=right | 2.8 km || 
|-id=241 bgcolor=#E9E9E9
| 567241 ||  || — || October 2, 2000 || Kitt Peak || Spacewatch ||  || align=right | 1.2 km || 
|-id=242 bgcolor=#E9E9E9
| 567242 ||  || — || October 4, 2000 || Kitt Peak || Spacewatch ||  || align=right | 1.6 km || 
|-id=243 bgcolor=#d6d6d6
| 567243 ||  || — || October 4, 2000 || Kitt Peak || Spacewatch ||  || align=right | 2.7 km || 
|-id=244 bgcolor=#d6d6d6
| 567244 ||  || — || October 1, 2000 || Socorro || LINEAR ||  || align=right | 2.9 km || 
|-id=245 bgcolor=#E9E9E9
| 567245 ||  || — || October 3, 2000 || Socorro || LINEAR ||  || align=right | 1.4 km || 
|-id=246 bgcolor=#E9E9E9
| 567246 ||  || — || September 30, 2000 || Kitt Peak || Spacewatch ||  || align=right | 1.0 km || 
|-id=247 bgcolor=#C2FFFF
| 567247 ||  || — || March 15, 2007 || Kitt Peak || Spacewatch || L5 || align=right | 9.2 km || 
|-id=248 bgcolor=#d6d6d6
| 567248 ||  || — || August 29, 2005 || Kitt Peak || Spacewatch ||  || align=right | 3.2 km || 
|-id=249 bgcolor=#d6d6d6
| 567249 ||  || — || April 9, 2003 || Kitt Peak || Spacewatch ||  || align=right | 2.5 km || 
|-id=250 bgcolor=#d6d6d6
| 567250 ||  || — || October 19, 2012 || Mount Lemmon || Mount Lemmon Survey ||  || align=right | 4.0 km || 
|-id=251 bgcolor=#E9E9E9
| 567251 ||  || — || May 14, 2008 || Mount Lemmon || Mount Lemmon Survey ||  || align=right | 1.1 km || 
|-id=252 bgcolor=#d6d6d6
| 567252 ||  || — || February 26, 2014 || Haleakala || Pan-STARRS ||  || align=right | 2.9 km || 
|-id=253 bgcolor=#d6d6d6
| 567253 ||  || — || January 12, 2008 || Mount Lemmon || Mount Lemmon Survey ||  || align=right | 2.3 km || 
|-id=254 bgcolor=#d6d6d6
| 567254 ||  || — || October 23, 2006 || Mount Lemmon || Mount Lemmon Survey ||  || align=right | 2.7 km || 
|-id=255 bgcolor=#fefefe
| 567255 ||  || — || May 7, 2010 || Mount Lemmon || Mount Lemmon Survey ||  || align=right data-sort-value="0.59" | 590 m || 
|-id=256 bgcolor=#d6d6d6
| 567256 ||  || — || September 23, 2011 || Haleakala || Pan-STARRS ||  || align=right | 2.3 km || 
|-id=257 bgcolor=#E9E9E9
| 567257 ||  || — || August 12, 2004 || Cerro Tololo || Cerro Tololo Obs. ||  || align=right | 1.1 km || 
|-id=258 bgcolor=#E9E9E9
| 567258 ||  || — || August 21, 2004 || Siding Spring || SSS ||  || align=right | 1.1 km || 
|-id=259 bgcolor=#d6d6d6
| 567259 ||  || — || August 26, 2016 || Haleakala || Pan-STARRS ||  || align=right | 2.4 km || 
|-id=260 bgcolor=#E9E9E9
| 567260 ||  || — || October 2, 2013 || Mount Lemmon || Mount Lemmon Survey ||  || align=right | 1.2 km || 
|-id=261 bgcolor=#d6d6d6
| 567261 ||  || — || September 24, 2011 || Haleakala || Pan-STARRS ||  || align=right | 2.3 km || 
|-id=262 bgcolor=#E9E9E9
| 567262 ||  || — || May 13, 2016 || Haleakala || Pan-STARRS ||  || align=right data-sort-value="0.87" | 870 m || 
|-id=263 bgcolor=#d6d6d6
| 567263 ||  || — || August 6, 2005 || Palomar || NEAT ||  || align=right | 3.1 km || 
|-id=264 bgcolor=#E9E9E9
| 567264 ||  || — || September 16, 2009 || Kitt Peak || Spacewatch ||  || align=right | 1.7 km || 
|-id=265 bgcolor=#fefefe
| 567265 ||  || — || August 10, 2007 || Kitt Peak || Spacewatch ||  || align=right data-sort-value="0.52" | 520 m || 
|-id=266 bgcolor=#d6d6d6
| 567266 ||  || — || February 26, 2014 || Mount Lemmon || Mount Lemmon Survey ||  || align=right | 2.9 km || 
|-id=267 bgcolor=#d6d6d6
| 567267 ||  || — || February 11, 2002 || Kitt Peak || Spacewatch ||  || align=right | 2.6 km || 
|-id=268 bgcolor=#E9E9E9
| 567268 ||  || — || November 25, 2005 || Kitt Peak || Spacewatch ||  || align=right | 1.4 km || 
|-id=269 bgcolor=#d6d6d6
| 567269 ||  || — || October 22, 2000 || Ondrejov || P. Pravec, P. Kušnirák ||  || align=right | 2.6 km || 
|-id=270 bgcolor=#E9E9E9
| 567270 ||  || — || October 25, 2000 || Socorro || LINEAR ||  || align=right | 1.5 km || 
|-id=271 bgcolor=#E9E9E9
| 567271 ||  || — || October 29, 2000 || Kitt Peak || Spacewatch ||  || align=right | 1.6 km || 
|-id=272 bgcolor=#d6d6d6
| 567272 ||  || — || October 29, 2000 || Kitt Peak || Spacewatch ||  || align=right | 2.5 km || 
|-id=273 bgcolor=#d6d6d6
| 567273 ||  || — || October 29, 2000 || Kitt Peak || Spacewatch ||  || align=right | 2.6 km || 
|-id=274 bgcolor=#E9E9E9
| 567274 ||  || — || September 16, 2009 || Kitt Peak || Spacewatch ||  || align=right | 1.9 km || 
|-id=275 bgcolor=#E9E9E9
| 567275 ||  || — || November 25, 2000 || Kitt Peak || Spacewatch ||  || align=right | 1.3 km || 
|-id=276 bgcolor=#E9E9E9
| 567276 ||  || — || November 28, 2000 || Junk Bond || D. Healy ||  || align=right | 1.6 km || 
|-id=277 bgcolor=#fefefe
| 567277 ||  || — || November 24, 2000 || Kitt Peak || Spacewatch ||  || align=right | 1.1 km || 
|-id=278 bgcolor=#E9E9E9
| 567278 ||  || — || November 17, 2000 || Kitt Peak || Spacewatch ||  || align=right | 1.3 km || 
|-id=279 bgcolor=#E9E9E9
| 567279 ||  || — || November 2, 2000 || Socorro || LINEAR ||  || align=right | 1.4 km || 
|-id=280 bgcolor=#d6d6d6
| 567280 ||  || — || November 20, 2000 || Socorro || LINEAR ||  || align=right | 3.6 km || 
|-id=281 bgcolor=#fefefe
| 567281 ||  || — || March 26, 2006 || Kitt Peak || Spacewatch ||  || align=right data-sort-value="0.86" | 860 m || 
|-id=282 bgcolor=#E9E9E9
| 567282 ||  || — || March 4, 2016 || Haleakala || Pan-STARRS ||  || align=right | 1.2 km || 
|-id=283 bgcolor=#E9E9E9
| 567283 ||  || — || June 1, 2003 || Cerro Tololo || M. W. Buie, K. J. Meech ||  || align=right | 1.7 km || 
|-id=284 bgcolor=#E9E9E9
| 567284 ||  || — || October 4, 2013 || Kitt Peak || Spacewatch ||  || align=right | 1.5 km || 
|-id=285 bgcolor=#E9E9E9
| 567285 ||  || — || January 26, 2011 || Mount Lemmon || Mount Lemmon Survey ||  || align=right | 1.9 km || 
|-id=286 bgcolor=#E9E9E9
| 567286 ||  || — || September 12, 2004 || Kitt Peak || Spacewatch ||  || align=right | 1.1 km || 
|-id=287 bgcolor=#fefefe
| 567287 ||  || — || October 7, 2007 || Mount Lemmon || Mount Lemmon Survey ||  || align=right data-sort-value="0.63" | 630 m || 
|-id=288 bgcolor=#E9E9E9
| 567288 ||  || — || November 12, 2013 || Kitt Peak || Spacewatch ||  || align=right | 1.4 km || 
|-id=289 bgcolor=#d6d6d6
| 567289 ||  || — || June 12, 2012 || Kitt Peak || Spacewatch || 7:4 || align=right | 3.7 km || 
|-id=290 bgcolor=#d6d6d6
| 567290 ||  || — || February 8, 2002 || Kitt Peak || R. Millis, M. W. Buie ||  || align=right | 2.3 km || 
|-id=291 bgcolor=#d6d6d6
| 567291 ||  || — || October 8, 1994 || Kitt Peak || Spacewatch ||  || align=right | 2.2 km || 
|-id=292 bgcolor=#fefefe
| 567292 ||  || — || August 26, 2014 || Haleakala || Pan-STARRS ||  || align=right data-sort-value="0.86" | 860 m || 
|-id=293 bgcolor=#E9E9E9
| 567293 ||  || — || October 12, 2013 || Kitt Peak || Spacewatch ||  || align=right | 1.2 km || 
|-id=294 bgcolor=#d6d6d6
| 567294 ||  || — || May 7, 2008 || Kitt Peak || Spacewatch ||  || align=right | 2.9 km || 
|-id=295 bgcolor=#E9E9E9
| 567295 ||  || — || July 9, 2003 || Kitt Peak || Spacewatch ||  || align=right | 2.6 km || 
|-id=296 bgcolor=#E9E9E9
| 567296 ||  || — || November 8, 2013 || Kitt Peak || Spacewatch ||  || align=right | 1.3 km || 
|-id=297 bgcolor=#E9E9E9
| 567297 ||  || — || November 4, 2013 || Haleakala || Pan-STARRS ||  || align=right | 1.2 km || 
|-id=298 bgcolor=#d6d6d6
| 567298 ||  || — || January 15, 2018 || Haleakala || Pan-STARRS ||  || align=right | 2.0 km || 
|-id=299 bgcolor=#E9E9E9
| 567299 ||  || — || December 22, 2005 || Kitt Peak || Spacewatch ||  || align=right | 1.1 km || 
|-id=300 bgcolor=#d6d6d6
| 567300 ||  || — || November 15, 2017 || Mount Lemmon || Mount Lemmon Survey ||  || align=right | 2.9 km || 
|}

567301–567400 

|-bgcolor=#d6d6d6
| 567301 ||  || — || January 22, 2015 || Haleakala || Pan-STARRS ||  || align=right | 2.8 km || 
|-id=302 bgcolor=#E9E9E9
| 567302 ||  || — || November 22, 2000 || Kitt Peak || Spacewatch ||  || align=right | 1.0 km || 
|-id=303 bgcolor=#E9E9E9
| 567303 ||  || — || November 27, 2013 || Haleakala || Pan-STARRS ||  || align=right | 1.3 km || 
|-id=304 bgcolor=#d6d6d6
| 567304 ||  || — || October 22, 2006 || Mount Lemmon || Mount Lemmon Survey ||  || align=right | 2.6 km || 
|-id=305 bgcolor=#d6d6d6
| 567305 ||  || — || December 18, 2000 || Kitt Peak || Spacewatch ||  || align=right | 2.0 km || 
|-id=306 bgcolor=#fefefe
| 567306 ||  || — || December 20, 2000 || Kitt Peak || Spacewatch || H || align=right data-sort-value="0.56" | 560 m || 
|-id=307 bgcolor=#fefefe
| 567307 ||  || — || December 19, 2000 || Socorro || LINEAR || H || align=right data-sort-value="0.91" | 910 m || 
|-id=308 bgcolor=#d6d6d6
| 567308 ||  || — || December 30, 2000 || Socorro || LINEAR || Tj (2.93) || align=right | 3.2 km || 
|-id=309 bgcolor=#E9E9E9
| 567309 ||  || — || October 7, 2008 || Mount Lemmon || Mount Lemmon Survey ||  || align=right | 2.1 km || 
|-id=310 bgcolor=#d6d6d6
| 567310 ||  || — || November 15, 2011 || Kitt Peak || Spacewatch ||  || align=right | 2.5 km || 
|-id=311 bgcolor=#d6d6d6
| 567311 ||  || — || December 21, 2006 || Kitt Peak || Spacewatch ||  || align=right | 2.7 km || 
|-id=312 bgcolor=#fefefe
| 567312 ||  || — || August 28, 2014 || Haleakala || Pan-STARRS ||  || align=right data-sort-value="0.75" | 750 m || 
|-id=313 bgcolor=#d6d6d6
| 567313 ||  || — || August 30, 2016 || Haleakala || Pan-STARRS ||  || align=right | 2.5 km || 
|-id=314 bgcolor=#fefefe
| 567314 ||  || — || May 7, 2013 || Kitt Peak || Spacewatch ||  || align=right data-sort-value="0.87" | 870 m || 
|-id=315 bgcolor=#E9E9E9
| 567315 ||  || — || December 17, 2000 || Kitt Peak || Spacewatch ||  || align=right | 1.1 km || 
|-id=316 bgcolor=#E9E9E9
| 567316 ||  || — || November 9, 2013 || Haleakala || Pan-STARRS ||  || align=right | 1.2 km || 
|-id=317 bgcolor=#E9E9E9
| 567317 ||  || — || October 6, 2008 || Kitt Peak || Spacewatch ||  || align=right | 1.3 km || 
|-id=318 bgcolor=#fefefe
| 567318 ||  || — || February 3, 2016 || Haleakala || Pan-STARRS ||  || align=right data-sort-value="0.70" | 700 m || 
|-id=319 bgcolor=#d6d6d6
| 567319 ||  || — || October 22, 2005 || Palomar || NEAT ||  || align=right | 2.6 km || 
|-id=320 bgcolor=#d6d6d6
| 567320 ||  || — || December 23, 2000 || Kitt Peak || Spacewatch ||  || align=right | 4.1 km || 
|-id=321 bgcolor=#d6d6d6
| 567321 ||  || — || January 1, 2001 || Kitt Peak || Spacewatch ||  || align=right | 2.5 km || 
|-id=322 bgcolor=#fefefe
| 567322 ||  || — || January 19, 2001 || Socorro || LINEAR ||  || align=right data-sort-value="0.95" | 950 m || 
|-id=323 bgcolor=#d6d6d6
| 567323 ||  || — || January 19, 2001 || Kitt Peak || Spacewatch ||  || align=right | 2.7 km || 
|-id=324 bgcolor=#E9E9E9
| 567324 ||  || — || January 18, 2001 || Socorro || LINEAR ||  || align=right | 2.0 km || 
|-id=325 bgcolor=#d6d6d6
| 567325 ||  || — || November 17, 2006 || Mount Lemmon || Mount Lemmon Survey ||  || align=right | 3.8 km || 
|-id=326 bgcolor=#d6d6d6
| 567326 ||  || — || July 17, 2016 || Haleakala || Pan-STARRS ||  || align=right | 3.0 km || 
|-id=327 bgcolor=#d6d6d6
| 567327 ||  || — || October 20, 2016 || Mount Lemmon || Mount Lemmon Survey ||  || align=right | 2.5 km || 
|-id=328 bgcolor=#fefefe
| 567328 ||  || — || September 21, 2003 || Kitt Peak || Spacewatch ||  || align=right data-sort-value="0.66" | 660 m || 
|-id=329 bgcolor=#C2FFFF
| 567329 ||  || — || September 24, 2009 || Zelenchukskaya Stn || T. V. Kryachko, B. Satovski || L4 || align=right | 8.5 km || 
|-id=330 bgcolor=#fefefe
| 567330 ||  || — || March 4, 2012 || Mount Lemmon || Mount Lemmon Survey ||  || align=right data-sort-value="0.57" | 570 m || 
|-id=331 bgcolor=#E9E9E9
| 567331 ||  || — || January 26, 2001 || Kitt Peak || Spacewatch ||  || align=right | 1.6 km || 
|-id=332 bgcolor=#fefefe
| 567332 ||  || — || March 4, 1994 || Kitt Peak || Spacewatch ||  || align=right data-sort-value="0.65" | 650 m || 
|-id=333 bgcolor=#fefefe
| 567333 ||  || — || February 2, 2001 || Socorro || LINEAR ||  || align=right | 1.2 km || 
|-id=334 bgcolor=#d6d6d6
| 567334 ||  || — || July 16, 2004 || Cerro Tololo || Cerro Tololo Obs. ||  || align=right | 3.2 km || 
|-id=335 bgcolor=#d6d6d6
| 567335 ||  || — || March 4, 2013 || Haleakala || Pan-STARRS ||  || align=right | 3.5 km || 
|-id=336 bgcolor=#E9E9E9
| 567336 ||  || — || October 22, 2003 || Kitt Peak || Spacewatch ||  || align=right | 2.3 km || 
|-id=337 bgcolor=#E9E9E9
| 567337 ||  || — || September 18, 2003 || Kitt Peak || Spacewatch ||  || align=right | 1.9 km || 
|-id=338 bgcolor=#E9E9E9
| 567338 ||  || — || November 2, 2008 || Mount Lemmon || Mount Lemmon Survey ||  || align=right | 1.9 km || 
|-id=339 bgcolor=#E9E9E9
| 567339 ||  || — || February 25, 2015 || Haleakala || Pan-STARRS ||  || align=right | 2.2 km || 
|-id=340 bgcolor=#fefefe
| 567340 ||  || — || April 4, 2005 || Mount Lemmon || Mount Lemmon Survey ||  || align=right data-sort-value="0.77" | 770 m || 
|-id=341 bgcolor=#E9E9E9
| 567341 ||  || — || September 27, 2003 || Kitt Peak || Spacewatch ||  || align=right | 1.5 km || 
|-id=342 bgcolor=#E9E9E9
| 567342 ||  || — || August 6, 2012 || Haleakala || Pan-STARRS ||  || align=right | 1.9 km || 
|-id=343 bgcolor=#E9E9E9
| 567343 ||  || — || February 16, 2015 || Haleakala || Pan-STARRS ||  || align=right | 1.7 km || 
|-id=344 bgcolor=#d6d6d6
| 567344 ||  || — || September 28, 2009 || Kitt Peak || Spacewatch ||  || align=right | 2.2 km || 
|-id=345 bgcolor=#E9E9E9
| 567345 ||  || — || September 20, 2003 || Palomar || NEAT ||  || align=right | 1.8 km || 
|-id=346 bgcolor=#fefefe
| 567346 ||  || — || February 16, 2015 || Haleakala || Pan-STARRS ||  || align=right data-sort-value="0.62" | 620 m || 
|-id=347 bgcolor=#E9E9E9
| 567347 ||  || — || October 8, 2004 || Kitt Peak || Spacewatch ||  || align=right | 1.8 km || 
|-id=348 bgcolor=#E9E9E9
| 567348 ||  || — || November 21, 2009 || Mount Lemmon || Mount Lemmon Survey ||  || align=right | 1.6 km || 
|-id=349 bgcolor=#C2FFFF
| 567349 ||  || — || November 24, 2009 || Mount Lemmon || Mount Lemmon Survey || L4 || align=right | 7.0 km || 
|-id=350 bgcolor=#E9E9E9
| 567350 ||  || — || March 26, 2001 || Kitt Peak || Spacewatch ||  || align=right | 1.2 km || 
|-id=351 bgcolor=#fefefe
| 567351 ||  || — || April 22, 2009 || Mount Lemmon || Mount Lemmon Survey ||  || align=right data-sort-value="0.76" | 760 m || 
|-id=352 bgcolor=#d6d6d6
| 567352 ||  || — || March 26, 2001 || Kitt Peak || M. W. Buie, S. D. Kern ||  || align=right | 1.7 km || 
|-id=353 bgcolor=#fefefe
| 567353 ||  || — || March 31, 2001 || Kitt Peak || Spacewatch ||  || align=right data-sort-value="0.75" | 750 m || 
|-id=354 bgcolor=#fefefe
| 567354 ||  || — || January 10, 2008 || Kitt Peak || Spacewatch ||  || align=right data-sort-value="0.59" | 590 m || 
|-id=355 bgcolor=#fefefe
| 567355 ||  || — || February 8, 2008 || Kitt Peak || Spacewatch ||  || align=right data-sort-value="0.50" | 500 m || 
|-id=356 bgcolor=#fefefe
| 567356 ||  || — || September 12, 2005 || Kitt Peak || Spacewatch ||  || align=right data-sort-value="0.53" | 530 m || 
|-id=357 bgcolor=#d6d6d6
| 567357 ||  || — || October 28, 2008 || Mount Lemmon || Mount Lemmon Survey ||  || align=right | 1.8 km || 
|-id=358 bgcolor=#E9E9E9
| 567358 ||  || — || September 11, 2007 || Mount Lemmon || Mount Lemmon Survey ||  || align=right | 1.8 km || 
|-id=359 bgcolor=#fefefe
| 567359 ||  || — || September 24, 2006 || Kitt Peak || Spacewatch ||  || align=right data-sort-value="0.62" | 620 m || 
|-id=360 bgcolor=#E9E9E9
| 567360 ||  || — || September 24, 2008 || Kitt Peak || Spacewatch ||  || align=right | 2.1 km || 
|-id=361 bgcolor=#E9E9E9
| 567361 ||  || — || September 10, 2007 || Mount Lemmon || Mount Lemmon Survey ||  || align=right | 2.0 km || 
|-id=362 bgcolor=#E9E9E9
| 567362 ||  || — || November 2, 2008 || Mount Lemmon || Mount Lemmon Survey ||  || align=right | 1.6 km || 
|-id=363 bgcolor=#d6d6d6
| 567363 ||  || — || October 5, 2004 || Kitt Peak || Spacewatch || THM || align=right | 1.8 km || 
|-id=364 bgcolor=#d6d6d6
| 567364 ||  || — || September 27, 2009 || Mount Lemmon || Mount Lemmon Survey ||  || align=right | 2.3 km || 
|-id=365 bgcolor=#E9E9E9
| 567365 ||  || — || March 24, 2001 || Kitt Peak || Spacewatch ||  || align=right | 1.3 km || 
|-id=366 bgcolor=#E9E9E9
| 567366 ||  || — || October 24, 2003 || Kitt Peak || Spacewatch ||  || align=right | 1.9 km || 
|-id=367 bgcolor=#E9E9E9
| 567367 ||  || — || September 28, 2003 || Kitt Peak || Spacewatch ||  || align=right | 1.9 km || 
|-id=368 bgcolor=#E9E9E9
| 567368 ||  || — || October 29, 2008 || Mount Lemmon || Mount Lemmon Survey ||  || align=right | 1.7 km || 
|-id=369 bgcolor=#E9E9E9
| 567369 ||  || — || August 8, 2015 || Haleakala || Pan-STARRS 2 ||  || align=right | 1.3 km || 
|-id=370 bgcolor=#d6d6d6
| 567370 ||  || — || January 7, 2017 || Mount Lemmon || Mount Lemmon Survey ||  || align=right | 2.6 km || 
|-id=371 bgcolor=#E9E9E9
| 567371 ||  || — || October 7, 2007 || Mount Lemmon || Mount Lemmon Survey ||  || align=right | 1.7 km || 
|-id=372 bgcolor=#fefefe
| 567372 ||  || — || April 30, 2005 || Kitt Peak || Spacewatch ||  || align=right data-sort-value="0.88" | 880 m || 
|-id=373 bgcolor=#E9E9E9
| 567373 ||  || — || December 30, 2013 || Haleakala || Pan-STARRS ||  || align=right | 1.8 km || 
|-id=374 bgcolor=#fefefe
| 567374 ||  || — || April 6, 2014 || Kitt Peak || Spacewatch ||  || align=right data-sort-value="0.52" | 520 m || 
|-id=375 bgcolor=#d6d6d6
| 567375 ||  || — || October 26, 2012 || Mount Lemmon || Mount Lemmon Survey ||  || align=right | 2.9 km || 
|-id=376 bgcolor=#fefefe
| 567376 ||  || — || October 11, 2012 || Haleakala || Pan-STARRS ||  || align=right data-sort-value="0.59" | 590 m || 
|-id=377 bgcolor=#fefefe
| 567377 ||  || — || December 6, 2007 || Kitt Peak || Spacewatch ||  || align=right data-sort-value="0.86" | 860 m || 
|-id=378 bgcolor=#E9E9E9
| 567378 ||  || — || September 28, 2008 || Mount Lemmon || Mount Lemmon Survey ||  || align=right | 2.5 km || 
|-id=379 bgcolor=#d6d6d6
| 567379 ||  || — || March 24, 2015 || Mount Lemmon || Mount Lemmon Survey ||  || align=right | 2.2 km || 
|-id=380 bgcolor=#fefefe
| 567380 ||  || — || December 27, 2005 || Mount Lemmon || Mount Lemmon Survey ||  || align=right data-sort-value="0.58" | 580 m || 
|-id=381 bgcolor=#E9E9E9
| 567381 ||  || — || April 15, 2010 || Kitt Peak || Spacewatch ||  || align=right | 2.6 km || 
|-id=382 bgcolor=#d6d6d6
| 567382 ||  || — || January 9, 2014 || Mount Lemmon || Mount Lemmon Survey ||  || align=right | 2.7 km || 
|-id=383 bgcolor=#fefefe
| 567383 ||  || — || January 20, 2012 || Haleakala || Pan-STARRS ||  || align=right data-sort-value="0.86" | 860 m || 
|-id=384 bgcolor=#E9E9E9
| 567384 ||  || — || May 23, 2001 || Cerro Tololo || J. L. Elliot, L. H. Wasserman ||  || align=right | 1.9 km || 
|-id=385 bgcolor=#fefefe
| 567385 ||  || — || April 29, 2014 || Haleakala || Pan-STARRS ||  || align=right data-sort-value="0.67" | 670 m || 
|-id=386 bgcolor=#fefefe
| 567386 ||  || — || March 28, 2012 || Mount Lemmon || Mount Lemmon Survey ||  || align=right data-sort-value="0.71" | 710 m || 
|-id=387 bgcolor=#fefefe
| 567387 ||  || — || October 26, 2013 || Kitt Peak || Spacewatch ||  || align=right data-sort-value="0.65" | 650 m || 
|-id=388 bgcolor=#d6d6d6
| 567388 ||  || — || January 2, 2011 || Mount Lemmon || Mount Lemmon Survey ||  || align=right | 3.1 km || 
|-id=389 bgcolor=#E9E9E9
| 567389 ||  || — || March 11, 2008 || Mount Lemmon || Mount Lemmon Survey ||  || align=right data-sort-value="0.86" | 860 m || 
|-id=390 bgcolor=#d6d6d6
| 567390 ||  || — || April 15, 2007 || Kitt Peak || Spacewatch || 7:4 || align=right | 3.4 km || 
|-id=391 bgcolor=#d6d6d6
| 567391 ||  || — || November 11, 2010 || Mount Lemmon || Mount Lemmon Survey ||  || align=right | 2.9 km || 
|-id=392 bgcolor=#E9E9E9
| 567392 ||  || — || July 13, 2001 || Palomar || NEAT ||  || align=right data-sort-value="0.94" | 940 m || 
|-id=393 bgcolor=#fefefe
| 567393 ||  || — || July 19, 2001 || Palomar || NEAT ||  || align=right | 1.0 km || 
|-id=394 bgcolor=#E9E9E9
| 567394 ||  || — || January 13, 2011 || Kitt Peak || Spacewatch ||  || align=right data-sort-value="0.79" | 790 m || 
|-id=395 bgcolor=#E9E9E9
| 567395 ||  || — || January 31, 2016 || Haleakala || Pan-STARRS ||  || align=right | 1.4 km || 
|-id=396 bgcolor=#E9E9E9
| 567396 ||  || — || August 11, 2001 || Palomar || NEAT ||  || align=right | 3.4 km || 
|-id=397 bgcolor=#fefefe
| 567397 ||  || — || June 26, 2011 || Mount Lemmon || Mount Lemmon Survey ||  || align=right data-sort-value="0.99" | 990 m || 
|-id=398 bgcolor=#fefefe
| 567398 ||  || — || January 10, 2006 || Kitt Peak || Spacewatch ||  || align=right data-sort-value="0.75" | 750 m || 
|-id=399 bgcolor=#fefefe
| 567399 ||  || — || July 30, 2001 || Palomar || NEAT || H || align=right data-sort-value="0.83" | 830 m || 
|-id=400 bgcolor=#E9E9E9
| 567400 ||  || — || August 19, 2001 || Cerro Tololo || Cerro Tololo Obs. ||  || align=right data-sort-value="0.86" | 860 m || 
|}

567401–567500 

|-bgcolor=#fefefe
| 567401 ||  || — || August 19, 2001 || Cerro Tololo || Cerro Tololo Obs. ||  || align=right data-sort-value="0.60" | 600 m || 
|-id=402 bgcolor=#d6d6d6
| 567402 ||  || — || August 19, 2001 || Cerro Tololo || Cerro Tololo Obs. ||  || align=right | 2.6 km || 
|-id=403 bgcolor=#E9E9E9
| 567403 ||  || — || December 13, 2006 || Kitt Peak || Spacewatch ||  || align=right | 1.0 km || 
|-id=404 bgcolor=#fefefe
| 567404 ||  || — || February 3, 2013 || Haleakala || Pan-STARRS || H || align=right data-sort-value="0.59" | 590 m || 
|-id=405 bgcolor=#fefefe
| 567405 ||  || — || January 12, 2010 || Kitt Peak || Spacewatch ||  || align=right data-sort-value="0.71" | 710 m || 
|-id=406 bgcolor=#d6d6d6
| 567406 ||  || — || September 21, 2011 || Mount Lemmon || Mount Lemmon Survey ||  || align=right | 2.0 km || 
|-id=407 bgcolor=#d6d6d6
| 567407 ||  || — || September 15, 2006 || Kitt Peak || Spacewatch ||  || align=right | 1.8 km || 
|-id=408 bgcolor=#E9E9E9
| 567408 ||  || — || August 25, 2001 || Palomar || NEAT ||  || align=right | 1.0 km || 
|-id=409 bgcolor=#d6d6d6
| 567409 ||  || — || September 12, 2001 || Socorro || LINEAR ||  || align=right | 2.7 km || 
|-id=410 bgcolor=#d6d6d6
| 567410 ||  || — || September 12, 2001 || Socorro || LINEAR ||  || align=right | 2.0 km || 
|-id=411 bgcolor=#fefefe
| 567411 ||  || — || September 11, 2001 || Kitt Peak || Spacewatch ||  || align=right data-sort-value="0.78" | 780 m || 
|-id=412 bgcolor=#fefefe
| 567412 ||  || — || September 12, 2001 || Kitt Peak || L. H. Wasserman, E. L. Ryan ||  || align=right data-sort-value="0.59" | 590 m || 
|-id=413 bgcolor=#d6d6d6
| 567413 ||  || — || September 20, 2001 || Kitt Peak || Spacewatch ||  || align=right | 2.1 km || 
|-id=414 bgcolor=#d6d6d6
| 567414 ||  || — || January 28, 2014 || Catalina || CSS ||  || align=right | 2.7 km || 
|-id=415 bgcolor=#d6d6d6
| 567415 ||  || — || May 4, 2010 || Kitt Peak || Spacewatch ||  || align=right | 2.1 km || 
|-id=416 bgcolor=#d6d6d6
| 567416 ||  || — || September 12, 2001 || Kitt Peak || Spacewatch ||  || align=right | 1.9 km || 
|-id=417 bgcolor=#fefefe
| 567417 ||  || — || September 20, 2001 || Socorro || LINEAR ||  || align=right data-sort-value="0.51" | 510 m || 
|-id=418 bgcolor=#E9E9E9
| 567418 ||  || — || September 20, 2001 || Socorro || LINEAR ||  || align=right data-sort-value="0.90" | 900 m || 
|-id=419 bgcolor=#d6d6d6
| 567419 ||  || — || September 16, 2001 || Socorro || LINEAR ||  || align=right | 2.3 km || 
|-id=420 bgcolor=#E9E9E9
| 567420 ||  || — || September 12, 2001 || Socorro || LINEAR ||  || align=right | 1.1 km || 
|-id=421 bgcolor=#d6d6d6
| 567421 ||  || — || September 19, 2001 || Socorro || LINEAR ||  || align=right | 2.5 km || 
|-id=422 bgcolor=#E9E9E9
| 567422 ||  || — || September 19, 2001 || Socorro || LINEAR ||  || align=right data-sort-value="0.83" | 830 m || 
|-id=423 bgcolor=#d6d6d6
| 567423 ||  || — || September 20, 2001 || Socorro || LINEAR ||  || align=right | 2.4 km || 
|-id=424 bgcolor=#d6d6d6
| 567424 ||  || — || September 19, 2001 || Kitt Peak || Spacewatch ||  || align=right | 2.1 km || 
|-id=425 bgcolor=#E9E9E9
| 567425 ||  || — || September 20, 2001 || Socorro || LINEAR ||  || align=right data-sort-value="0.73" | 730 m || 
|-id=426 bgcolor=#d6d6d6
| 567426 ||  || — || September 21, 2001 || Socorro || LINEAR ||  || align=right | 2.7 km || 
|-id=427 bgcolor=#fefefe
| 567427 ||  || — || September 16, 2001 || Socorro || LINEAR ||  || align=right data-sort-value="0.78" | 780 m || 
|-id=428 bgcolor=#E9E9E9
| 567428 ||  || — || September 25, 2001 || Socorro || LINEAR ||  || align=right | 1.9 km || 
|-id=429 bgcolor=#E9E9E9
| 567429 ||  || — || September 19, 2001 || Kitt Peak || Spacewatch ||  || align=right data-sort-value="0.80" | 800 m || 
|-id=430 bgcolor=#d6d6d6
| 567430 ||  || — || October 15, 2001 || Palomar || NEAT ||  || align=right | 3.4 km || 
|-id=431 bgcolor=#d6d6d6
| 567431 ||  || — || July 5, 2016 || Haleakala || Pan-STARRS ||  || align=right | 2.5 km || 
|-id=432 bgcolor=#E9E9E9
| 567432 ||  || — || August 27, 2005 || Palomar || NEAT ||  || align=right data-sort-value="0.86" | 860 m || 
|-id=433 bgcolor=#d6d6d6
| 567433 ||  || — || October 23, 2001 || Palomar || NEAT ||  || align=right | 2.4 km || 
|-id=434 bgcolor=#E9E9E9
| 567434 ||  || — || October 28, 2001 || Palomar || NEAT ||  || align=right | 1.4 km || 
|-id=435 bgcolor=#E9E9E9
| 567435 ||  || — || February 24, 1995 || Kitt Peak || Spacewatch ||  || align=right data-sort-value="0.97" | 970 m || 
|-id=436 bgcolor=#d6d6d6
| 567436 ||  || — || June 18, 2015 || Haleakala || Pan-STARRS ||  || align=right | 2.2 km || 
|-id=437 bgcolor=#fefefe
| 567437 ||  || — || March 13, 2007 || Mount Lemmon || Mount Lemmon Survey ||  || align=right data-sort-value="0.61" | 610 m || 
|-id=438 bgcolor=#d6d6d6
| 567438 ||  || — || January 17, 2013 || Kitt Peak || Spacewatch ||  || align=right | 2.1 km || 
|-id=439 bgcolor=#d6d6d6
| 567439 ||  || — || September 20, 2001 || Kitt Peak || Spacewatch ||  || align=right | 2.0 km || 
|-id=440 bgcolor=#d6d6d6
| 567440 ||  || — || September 18, 2001 || Apache Point || SDSS Collaboration ||  || align=right | 2.1 km || 
|-id=441 bgcolor=#d6d6d6
| 567441 ||  || — || October 23, 2012 || Kitt Peak || Spacewatch ||  || align=right | 2.1 km || 
|-id=442 bgcolor=#d6d6d6
| 567442 ||  || — || March 29, 2004 || Kitt Peak || Spacewatch ||  || align=right | 2.4 km || 
|-id=443 bgcolor=#E9E9E9
| 567443 ||  || — || August 5, 2005 || Palomar || NEAT ||  || align=right | 1.2 km || 
|-id=444 bgcolor=#d6d6d6
| 567444 ||  || — || October 4, 2006 || Mount Lemmon || Mount Lemmon Survey ||  || align=right | 2.7 km || 
|-id=445 bgcolor=#E9E9E9
| 567445 ||  || — || June 5, 2005 || Kitt Peak || Spacewatch ||  || align=right | 1.8 km || 
|-id=446 bgcolor=#E9E9E9
| 567446 ||  || — || July 5, 2017 || Haleakala || Pan-STARRS ||  || align=right data-sort-value="0.79" | 790 m || 
|-id=447 bgcolor=#d6d6d6
| 567447 ||  || — || October 20, 2012 || Kitt Peak || Spacewatch ||  || align=right | 2.3 km || 
|-id=448 bgcolor=#E9E9E9
| 567448 ||  || — || October 14, 2001 || Socorro || LINEAR ||  || align=right | 1.2 km || 
|-id=449 bgcolor=#fefefe
| 567449 ||  || — || October 11, 2001 || Kitt Peak || Spacewatch ||  || align=right data-sort-value="0.63" | 630 m || 
|-id=450 bgcolor=#E9E9E9
| 567450 ||  || — || October 11, 2001 || Socorro || LINEAR ||  || align=right | 1.3 km || 
|-id=451 bgcolor=#E9E9E9
| 567451 ||  || — || October 11, 2001 || Palomar || NEAT ||  || align=right | 1.3 km || 
|-id=452 bgcolor=#fefefe
| 567452 ||  || — || October 15, 2001 || Kitt Peak || Spacewatch ||  || align=right data-sort-value="0.78" | 780 m || 
|-id=453 bgcolor=#E9E9E9
| 567453 ||  || — || March 26, 2003 || Kitt Peak || Spacewatch ||  || align=right | 1.1 km || 
|-id=454 bgcolor=#E9E9E9
| 567454 ||  || — || September 25, 2009 || Mount Lemmon || Mount Lemmon Survey ||  || align=right data-sort-value="0.87" | 870 m || 
|-id=455 bgcolor=#E9E9E9
| 567455 ||  || — || February 8, 2011 || Mount Lemmon || Mount Lemmon Survey ||  || align=right data-sort-value="0.99" | 990 m || 
|-id=456 bgcolor=#d6d6d6
| 567456 ||  || — || February 20, 2009 || Kitt Peak || Spacewatch ||  || align=right | 2.1 km || 
|-id=457 bgcolor=#d6d6d6
| 567457 ||  || — || October 14, 2001 || Apache Point || SDSS Collaboration ||  || align=right | 2.0 km || 
|-id=458 bgcolor=#fefefe
| 567458 ||  || — || December 23, 2012 || Haleakala || Pan-STARRS ||  || align=right data-sort-value="0.75" | 750 m || 
|-id=459 bgcolor=#fefefe
| 567459 ||  || — || October 15, 2001 || Palomar || NEAT ||  || align=right data-sort-value="0.90" | 900 m || 
|-id=460 bgcolor=#fefefe
| 567460 ||  || — || November 24, 2008 || Kitt Peak || Spacewatch ||  || align=right data-sort-value="0.59" | 590 m || 
|-id=461 bgcolor=#C2FFFF
| 567461 ||  || — || March 16, 2007 || Mount Lemmon || Mount Lemmon Survey || L5 || align=right | 8.3 km || 
|-id=462 bgcolor=#d6d6d6
| 567462 ||  || — || October 14, 2001 || Kitt Peak || Spacewatch ||  || align=right | 2.4 km || 
|-id=463 bgcolor=#d6d6d6
| 567463 ||  || — || October 14, 2001 || Kitt Peak || Spacewatch ||  || align=right | 2.4 km || 
|-id=464 bgcolor=#d6d6d6
| 567464 ||  || — || October 16, 2001 || Palomar || NEAT ||  || align=right | 2.5 km || 
|-id=465 bgcolor=#d6d6d6
| 567465 ||  || — || October 16, 2001 || Kitt Peak || Spacewatch ||  || align=right | 2.3 km || 
|-id=466 bgcolor=#d6d6d6
| 567466 ||  || — || October 17, 2001 || Kitt Peak || Spacewatch ||  || align=right | 2.9 km || 
|-id=467 bgcolor=#d6d6d6
| 567467 ||  || — || October 21, 2001 || Kitt Peak || Spacewatch ||  || align=right | 2.3 km || 
|-id=468 bgcolor=#E9E9E9
| 567468 ||  || — || October 20, 2001 || Socorro || LINEAR ||  || align=right | 1.1 km || 
|-id=469 bgcolor=#fefefe
| 567469 ||  || — || October 21, 2001 || Socorro || LINEAR ||  || align=right data-sort-value="0.60" | 600 m || 
|-id=470 bgcolor=#d6d6d6
| 567470 ||  || — || October 21, 2001 || Socorro || LINEAR ||  || align=right | 2.5 km || 
|-id=471 bgcolor=#d6d6d6
| 567471 ||  || — || October 18, 2001 || Palomar || NEAT ||  || align=right | 3.0 km || 
|-id=472 bgcolor=#fefefe
| 567472 ||  || — || October 23, 2001 || Socorro || LINEAR ||  || align=right data-sort-value="0.67" | 670 m || 
|-id=473 bgcolor=#d6d6d6
| 567473 ||  || — || October 21, 2001 || Kitt Peak || Spacewatch ||  || align=right | 2.5 km || 
|-id=474 bgcolor=#fefefe
| 567474 ||  || — || October 23, 2001 || Socorro || LINEAR ||  || align=right data-sort-value="0.74" | 740 m || 
|-id=475 bgcolor=#d6d6d6
| 567475 ||  || — || September 28, 2001 || Palomar || NEAT || EOS || align=right | 1.9 km || 
|-id=476 bgcolor=#d6d6d6
| 567476 ||  || — || September 28, 2001 || Palomar || NEAT ||  || align=right | 2.4 km || 
|-id=477 bgcolor=#d6d6d6
| 567477 ||  || — || October 18, 2001 || Palomar || NEAT ||  || align=right | 2.1 km || 
|-id=478 bgcolor=#d6d6d6
| 567478 ||  || — || October 18, 2001 || Palomar || NEAT ||  || align=right | 2.8 km || 
|-id=479 bgcolor=#E9E9E9
| 567479 ||  || — || October 21, 2001 || Socorro || LINEAR || DOR || align=right | 1.6 km || 
|-id=480 bgcolor=#d6d6d6
| 567480 ||  || — || October 20, 2001 || Socorro || LINEAR ||  || align=right | 3.2 km || 
|-id=481 bgcolor=#d6d6d6
| 567481 ||  || — || September 20, 2001 || Kitt Peak || Spacewatch ||  || align=right | 3.0 km || 
|-id=482 bgcolor=#d6d6d6
| 567482 ||  || — || October 21, 2001 || Socorro || LINEAR ||  || align=right | 3.2 km || 
|-id=483 bgcolor=#d6d6d6
| 567483 ||  || — || October 23, 2001 || Palomar || NEAT ||  || align=right | 3.0 km || 
|-id=484 bgcolor=#fefefe
| 567484 ||  || — || February 24, 2006 || Mount Lemmon || Mount Lemmon Survey ||  || align=right data-sort-value="0.66" | 660 m || 
|-id=485 bgcolor=#E9E9E9
| 567485 ||  || — || March 26, 2003 || Palomar || NEAT ||  || align=right | 1.0 km || 
|-id=486 bgcolor=#d6d6d6
| 567486 ||  || — || January 25, 2003 || Apache Point || SDSS Collaboration ||  || align=right | 2.9 km || 
|-id=487 bgcolor=#d6d6d6
| 567487 ||  || — || September 14, 2006 || Kitt Peak || Spacewatch ||  || align=right | 2.4 km || 
|-id=488 bgcolor=#fefefe
| 567488 ||  || — || December 6, 2005 || Kitt Peak || Spacewatch ||  || align=right data-sort-value="0.65" | 650 m || 
|-id=489 bgcolor=#E9E9E9
| 567489 ||  || — || October 22, 2014 || Mount Lemmon || Mount Lemmon Survey ||  || align=right | 1.2 km || 
|-id=490 bgcolor=#d6d6d6
| 567490 ||  || — || October 25, 2012 || Piszkesteto || G. Hodosán ||  || align=right | 2.9 km || 
|-id=491 bgcolor=#d6d6d6
| 567491 ||  || — || October 25, 2001 || Kitt Peak || Spacewatch ||  || align=right | 3.0 km || 
|-id=492 bgcolor=#d6d6d6
| 567492 ||  || — || February 24, 2014 || Haleakala || Pan-STARRS ||  || align=right | 2.9 km || 
|-id=493 bgcolor=#d6d6d6
| 567493 ||  || — || September 17, 2006 || Kitt Peak || Spacewatch ||  || align=right | 2.3 km || 
|-id=494 bgcolor=#d6d6d6
| 567494 ||  || — || October 23, 2001 || Palomar || NEAT ||  || align=right | 2.4 km || 
|-id=495 bgcolor=#d6d6d6
| 567495 ||  || — || November 22, 2012 || Kitt Peak || Spacewatch ||  || align=right | 2.4 km || 
|-id=496 bgcolor=#E9E9E9
| 567496 ||  || — || October 27, 1997 || Flagstaff || B. A. Skiff ||  || align=right data-sort-value="0.99" | 990 m || 
|-id=497 bgcolor=#E9E9E9
| 567497 ||  || — || October 24, 2001 || Kitt Peak || Spacewatch ||  || align=right data-sort-value="0.70" | 700 m || 
|-id=498 bgcolor=#d6d6d6
| 567498 ||  || — || May 18, 2015 || Mount Lemmon || Mount Lemmon Survey ||  || align=right | 2.3 km || 
|-id=499 bgcolor=#fefefe
| 567499 ||  || — || August 25, 2012 || Haleakala || Pan-STARRS ||  || align=right data-sort-value="0.80" | 800 m || 
|-id=500 bgcolor=#d6d6d6
| 567500 ||  || — || September 30, 2006 || Mount Lemmon || Mount Lemmon Survey ||  || align=right | 1.9 km || 
|}

567501–567600 

|-bgcolor=#E9E9E9
| 567501 ||  || — || September 10, 2015 || Bergisch Gladbach || W. Bickel ||  || align=right | 2.1 km || 
|-id=502 bgcolor=#fefefe
| 567502 ||  || — || December 3, 2008 || Kitt Peak || Spacewatch ||  || align=right data-sort-value="0.68" | 680 m || 
|-id=503 bgcolor=#d6d6d6
| 567503 ||  || — || November 11, 2001 || Socorro || LINEAR ||  || align=right | 3.0 km || 
|-id=504 bgcolor=#fefefe
| 567504 ||  || — || October 25, 2001 || Socorro || LINEAR || H || align=right data-sort-value="0.70" | 700 m || 
|-id=505 bgcolor=#d6d6d6
| 567505 ||  || — || November 14, 2001 || Kitt Peak || Spacewatch || EOS || align=right | 2.3 km || 
|-id=506 bgcolor=#E9E9E9
| 567506 ||  || — || November 12, 2001 || Apache Point || SDSS Collaboration ||  || align=right data-sort-value="0.88" | 880 m || 
|-id=507 bgcolor=#E9E9E9
| 567507 ||  || — || November 12, 2001 || Apache Point || SDSS Collaboration ||  || align=right data-sort-value="0.80" | 800 m || 
|-id=508 bgcolor=#d6d6d6
| 567508 ||  || — || January 28, 2003 || Kitt Peak || Spacewatch ||  || align=right | 2.4 km || 
|-id=509 bgcolor=#d6d6d6
| 567509 ||  || — || May 14, 2004 || Kitt Peak || Spacewatch ||  || align=right | 2.3 km || 
|-id=510 bgcolor=#E9E9E9
| 567510 ||  || — || March 11, 2011 || Mayhill-ISON || L. Elenin ||  || align=right data-sort-value="0.83" | 830 m || 
|-id=511 bgcolor=#d6d6d6
| 567511 ||  || — || September 23, 2012 || Mount Lemmon || Mount Lemmon Survey ||  || align=right | 2.4 km || 
|-id=512 bgcolor=#d6d6d6
| 567512 ||  || — || October 23, 2012 || Kitt Peak || Spacewatch ||  || align=right | 3.2 km || 
|-id=513 bgcolor=#C2FFFF
| 567513 ||  || — || October 25, 2013 || Mount Lemmon || Mount Lemmon Survey || L5 || align=right | 8.0 km || 
|-id=514 bgcolor=#d6d6d6
| 567514 ||  || — || October 21, 2001 || Socorro || LINEAR || EUP || align=right | 3.6 km || 
|-id=515 bgcolor=#d6d6d6
| 567515 ||  || — || November 17, 2001 || Socorro || LINEAR ||  || align=right | 3.8 km || 
|-id=516 bgcolor=#d6d6d6
| 567516 ||  || — || November 17, 2001 || Socorro || LINEAR ||  || align=right | 2.9 km || 
|-id=517 bgcolor=#d6d6d6
| 567517 ||  || — || November 18, 2001 || Socorro || LINEAR ||  || align=right | 3.2 km || 
|-id=518 bgcolor=#d6d6d6
| 567518 ||  || — || November 19, 2001 || Socorro || LINEAR ||  || align=right | 3.1 km || 
|-id=519 bgcolor=#d6d6d6
| 567519 ||  || — || November 12, 2001 || Kitt Peak || Spacewatch ||  || align=right | 3.2 km || 
|-id=520 bgcolor=#fefefe
| 567520 ||  || — || November 20, 2001 || Socorro || LINEAR ||  || align=right data-sort-value="0.60" | 600 m || 
|-id=521 bgcolor=#d6d6d6
| 567521 ||  || — || November 20, 2001 || Socorro || LINEAR ||  || align=right | 2.7 km || 
|-id=522 bgcolor=#fefefe
| 567522 ||  || — || November 11, 2001 || Kitt Peak || Spacewatch ||  || align=right data-sort-value="0.77" | 770 m || 
|-id=523 bgcolor=#d6d6d6
| 567523 ||  || — || November 11, 2001 || Kitt Peak || Spacewatch ||  || align=right | 2.6 km || 
|-id=524 bgcolor=#E9E9E9
| 567524 ||  || — || November 20, 2001 || Kitt Peak || Spacewatch ||  || align=right | 1.4 km || 
|-id=525 bgcolor=#d6d6d6
| 567525 ||  || — || November 9, 2001 || Socorro || LINEAR || Tj (2.97) || align=right | 3.4 km || 
|-id=526 bgcolor=#fefefe
| 567526 ||  || — || September 29, 2009 || Kitt Peak || Spacewatch || H || align=right data-sort-value="0.62" | 620 m || 
|-id=527 bgcolor=#d6d6d6
| 567527 ||  || — || February 13, 2008 || Mount Lemmon || Mount Lemmon Survey ||  || align=right | 2.6 km || 
|-id=528 bgcolor=#fefefe
| 567528 ||  || — || September 24, 2011 || Mount Lemmon || Mount Lemmon Survey ||  || align=right data-sort-value="0.57" | 570 m || 
|-id=529 bgcolor=#E9E9E9
| 567529 ||  || — || November 21, 2001 || Apache Point || SDSS Collaboration ||  || align=right | 1.2 km || 
|-id=530 bgcolor=#C2FFFF
| 567530 ||  || — || February 10, 2008 || Mount Lemmon || Mount Lemmon Survey || L5 || align=right | 7.9 km || 
|-id=531 bgcolor=#E9E9E9
| 567531 ||  || — || December 10, 2001 || Socorro || LINEAR ||  || align=right | 1.8 km || 
|-id=532 bgcolor=#FA8072
| 567532 ||  || — || December 14, 2001 || Socorro || LINEAR || H || align=right data-sort-value="0.49" | 490 m || 
|-id=533 bgcolor=#E9E9E9
| 567533 ||  || — || December 14, 2001 || Socorro || LINEAR ||  || align=right | 1.4 km || 
|-id=534 bgcolor=#fefefe
| 567534 ||  || — || December 14, 2001 || Socorro || LINEAR ||  || align=right data-sort-value="0.69" | 690 m || 
|-id=535 bgcolor=#fefefe
| 567535 ||  || — || November 20, 2001 || Socorro || LINEAR ||  || align=right data-sort-value="0.77" | 770 m || 
|-id=536 bgcolor=#fefefe
| 567536 ||  || — || November 21, 2001 || Haleakala || AMOS || H || align=right data-sort-value="0.51" | 510 m || 
|-id=537 bgcolor=#d6d6d6
| 567537 ||  || — || February 28, 2014 || Mount Lemmon || Mount Lemmon Survey ||  || align=right | 2.6 km || 
|-id=538 bgcolor=#E9E9E9
| 567538 ||  || — || December 10, 2005 || Kitt Peak || Spacewatch ||  || align=right | 1.8 km || 
|-id=539 bgcolor=#d6d6d6
| 567539 ||  || — || October 28, 2006 || Mount Lemmon || Mount Lemmon Survey ||  || align=right | 3.4 km || 
|-id=540 bgcolor=#E9E9E9
| 567540 ||  || — || November 6, 2005 || Mount Lemmon || Mount Lemmon Survey ||  || align=right | 1.0 km || 
|-id=541 bgcolor=#E9E9E9
| 567541 ||  || — || September 18, 2009 || Mount Lemmon || Mount Lemmon Survey ||  || align=right | 1.2 km || 
|-id=542 bgcolor=#fefefe
| 567542 ||  || — || January 26, 2014 || Haleakala || Pan-STARRS ||  || align=right data-sort-value="0.75" | 750 m || 
|-id=543 bgcolor=#d6d6d6
| 567543 ||  || — || February 27, 2009 || Kitt Peak || Spacewatch ||  || align=right | 2.4 km || 
|-id=544 bgcolor=#d6d6d6
| 567544 ||  || — || December 18, 2001 || Socorro || LINEAR ||  || align=right | 2.9 km || 
|-id=545 bgcolor=#d6d6d6
| 567545 ||  || — || December 18, 2001 || Socorro || LINEAR ||  || align=right | 3.5 km || 
|-id=546 bgcolor=#d6d6d6
| 567546 ||  || — || December 18, 2001 || Socorro || LINEAR ||  || align=right | 2.6 km || 
|-id=547 bgcolor=#d6d6d6
| 567547 ||  || — || December 17, 2001 || Kitt Peak || Spacewatch ||  || align=right | 2.3 km || 
|-id=548 bgcolor=#d6d6d6
| 567548 ||  || — || December 15, 2001 || Socorro || LINEAR ||  || align=right | 3.8 km || 
|-id=549 bgcolor=#E9E9E9
| 567549 ||  || — || December 19, 2001 || Socorro || LINEAR ||  || align=right | 1.6 km || 
|-id=550 bgcolor=#E9E9E9
| 567550 ||  || — || January 28, 2011 || Kitt Peak || Spacewatch ||  || align=right | 1.7 km || 
|-id=551 bgcolor=#d6d6d6
| 567551 ||  || — || April 7, 2003 || Kitt Peak || Spacewatch ||  || align=right | 3.9 km || 
|-id=552 bgcolor=#d6d6d6
| 567552 ||  || — || December 23, 2001 || Kitt Peak || Spacewatch ||  || align=right | 3.0 km || 
|-id=553 bgcolor=#d6d6d6
| 567553 ||  || — || May 21, 2015 || Haleakala || Pan-STARRS ||  || align=right | 2.6 km || 
|-id=554 bgcolor=#E9E9E9
| 567554 ||  || — || January 26, 2015 || Haleakala || Pan-STARRS ||  || align=right data-sort-value="0.90" | 900 m || 
|-id=555 bgcolor=#d6d6d6
| 567555 ||  || — || October 21, 2011 || Mount Lemmon || Mount Lemmon Survey ||  || align=right | 2.6 km || 
|-id=556 bgcolor=#d6d6d6
| 567556 ||  || — || April 12, 2015 || Haleakala || Pan-STARRS ||  || align=right | 2.7 km || 
|-id=557 bgcolor=#d6d6d6
| 567557 ||  || — || April 10, 2003 || Kitt Peak || Spacewatch ||  || align=right | 2.6 km || 
|-id=558 bgcolor=#fefefe
| 567558 ||  || — || October 8, 2004 || Kitt Peak || Spacewatch ||  || align=right data-sort-value="0.58" | 580 m || 
|-id=559 bgcolor=#d6d6d6
| 567559 ||  || — || December 17, 2001 || Socorro || LINEAR || Tj (2.86) || align=right | 2.9 km || 
|-id=560 bgcolor=#E9E9E9
| 567560 ||  || — || January 9, 2002 || Socorro || LINEAR ||  || align=right | 1.5 km || 
|-id=561 bgcolor=#d6d6d6
| 567561 ||  || — || January 8, 2002 || Socorro || LINEAR ||  || align=right | 3.1 km || 
|-id=562 bgcolor=#E9E9E9
| 567562 ||  || — || December 18, 2001 || Palomar || NEAT ||  || align=right | 1.5 km || 
|-id=563 bgcolor=#d6d6d6
| 567563 ||  || — || January 8, 2002 || Socorro || LINEAR ||  || align=right | 3.5 km || 
|-id=564 bgcolor=#fefefe
| 567564 ||  || — || December 17, 2001 || Palomar || NEAT ||  || align=right data-sort-value="0.85" | 850 m || 
|-id=565 bgcolor=#fefefe
| 567565 ||  || — || January 8, 2002 || Kitt Peak || Spacewatch ||  || align=right data-sort-value="0.70" | 700 m || 
|-id=566 bgcolor=#d6d6d6
| 567566 ||  || — || January 12, 2002 || Palomar || NEAT ||  || align=right | 3.9 km || 
|-id=567 bgcolor=#E9E9E9
| 567567 ||  || — || January 13, 2002 || Kitt Peak || Spacewatch ||  || align=right | 1.2 km || 
|-id=568 bgcolor=#d6d6d6
| 567568 ||  || — || January 12, 2002 || Kitt Peak || Spacewatch ||  || align=right | 2.7 km || 
|-id=569 bgcolor=#fefefe
| 567569 ||  || — || January 12, 2002 || Kitt Peak || Spacewatch ||  || align=right data-sort-value="0.60" | 600 m || 
|-id=570 bgcolor=#d6d6d6
| 567570 ||  || — || November 17, 2006 || Kitt Peak || Spacewatch ||  || align=right | 3.4 km || 
|-id=571 bgcolor=#d6d6d6
| 567571 ||  || — || October 23, 2012 || Mount Lemmon || Mount Lemmon Survey ||  || align=right | 2.8 km || 
|-id=572 bgcolor=#d6d6d6
| 567572 ||  || — || September 29, 2011 || Mount Lemmon || Mount Lemmon Survey ||  || align=right | 2.9 km || 
|-id=573 bgcolor=#d6d6d6
| 567573 ||  || — || January 9, 2002 || Kitt Peak || Spacewatch ||  || align=right | 2.6 km || 
|-id=574 bgcolor=#d6d6d6
| 567574 ||  || — || March 26, 2014 || Mount Lemmon || Mount Lemmon Survey ||  || align=right | 2.5 km || 
|-id=575 bgcolor=#d6d6d6
| 567575 ||  || — || February 24, 2014 || Haleakala || Pan-STARRS ||  || align=right | 2.6 km || 
|-id=576 bgcolor=#fefefe
| 567576 ||  || — || February 8, 2013 || Haleakala || Pan-STARRS ||  || align=right data-sort-value="0.68" | 680 m || 
|-id=577 bgcolor=#E9E9E9
| 567577 ||  || — || September 11, 2004 || Kitt Peak || Spacewatch ||  || align=right | 1.3 km || 
|-id=578 bgcolor=#E9E9E9
| 567578 ||  || — || November 27, 2013 || Haleakala || Pan-STARRS ||  || align=right data-sort-value="0.95" | 950 m || 
|-id=579 bgcolor=#fefefe
| 567579 ||  || — || September 26, 2011 || Haleakala || Pan-STARRS ||  || align=right data-sort-value="0.45" | 450 m || 
|-id=580 bgcolor=#d6d6d6
| 567580 Latuni ||  ||  || October 23, 2017 || Baldone || K. Černis, I. Eglītis ||  || align=right | 2.8 km || 
|-id=581 bgcolor=#d6d6d6
| 567581 ||  || — || October 1, 2011 || Piszkesteto || K. Sárneczky ||  || align=right | 3.1 km || 
|-id=582 bgcolor=#d6d6d6
| 567582 ||  || — || February 27, 2014 || Haleakala || Pan-STARRS ||  || align=right | 2.1 km || 
|-id=583 bgcolor=#d6d6d6
| 567583 ||  || — || January 5, 2002 || Kitt Peak || Spacewatch ||  || align=right | 2.8 km || 
|-id=584 bgcolor=#d6d6d6
| 567584 ||  || — || January 10, 2007 || Kitt Peak || Spacewatch ||  || align=right | 3.0 km || 
|-id=585 bgcolor=#d6d6d6
| 567585 ||  || — || July 12, 2015 || Haleakala || Pan-STARRS ||  || align=right | 2.5 km || 
|-id=586 bgcolor=#d6d6d6
| 567586 ||  || — || June 22, 2004 || Kitt Peak || Spacewatch ||  || align=right | 3.1 km || 
|-id=587 bgcolor=#d6d6d6
| 567587 ||  || — || February 8, 2008 || Kitt Peak || Spacewatch ||  || align=right | 2.8 km || 
|-id=588 bgcolor=#E9E9E9
| 567588 ||  || — || January 26, 2015 || Haleakala || Pan-STARRS ||  || align=right | 1.4 km || 
|-id=589 bgcolor=#E9E9E9
| 567589 ||  || — || October 14, 2009 || Mount Lemmon || Mount Lemmon Survey ||  || align=right | 1.3 km || 
|-id=590 bgcolor=#fefefe
| 567590 ||  || — || February 6, 2002 || Kitt Peak || Spacewatch ||  || align=right data-sort-value="0.75" | 750 m || 
|-id=591 bgcolor=#fefefe
| 567591 ||  || — || February 7, 2002 || Socorro || LINEAR || H || align=right data-sort-value="0.57" | 570 m || 
|-id=592 bgcolor=#fefefe
| 567592 ||  || — || February 4, 2002 || Palomar || NEAT || H || align=right data-sort-value="0.67" | 670 m || 
|-id=593 bgcolor=#E9E9E9
| 567593 ||  || — || January 8, 2002 || Socorro || LINEAR ||  || align=right | 1.2 km || 
|-id=594 bgcolor=#E9E9E9
| 567594 ||  || — || January 7, 2002 || Kitt Peak || Spacewatch ||  || align=right | 1.3 km || 
|-id=595 bgcolor=#E9E9E9
| 567595 ||  || — || February 7, 2002 || Socorro || LINEAR ||  || align=right | 1.5 km || 
|-id=596 bgcolor=#fefefe
| 567596 ||  || — || February 7, 2002 || Kitt Peak || Spacewatch ||  || align=right data-sort-value="0.77" | 770 m || 
|-id=597 bgcolor=#fefefe
| 567597 ||  || — || February 6, 2002 || Palomar || NEAT || H || align=right data-sort-value="0.57" | 570 m || 
|-id=598 bgcolor=#d6d6d6
| 567598 ||  || — || February 10, 2002 || Socorro || LINEAR ||  || align=right | 3.1 km || 
|-id=599 bgcolor=#d6d6d6
| 567599 ||  || — || January 12, 2002 || Palomar || NEAT || EOS || align=right | 2.3 km || 
|-id=600 bgcolor=#fefefe
| 567600 ||  || — || February 10, 2002 || Socorro || LINEAR ||  || align=right data-sort-value="0.63" | 630 m || 
|}

567601–567700 

|-bgcolor=#fefefe
| 567601 ||  || — || February 8, 2002 || Kitt Peak || Spacewatch ||  || align=right data-sort-value="0.73" | 730 m || 
|-id=602 bgcolor=#d6d6d6
| 567602 ||  || — || February 8, 2002 || Kitt Peak || Spacewatch ||  || align=right | 2.6 km || 
|-id=603 bgcolor=#E9E9E9
| 567603 ||  || — || February 9, 2002 || Kitt Peak || Spacewatch ||  || align=right | 1.9 km || 
|-id=604 bgcolor=#E9E9E9
| 567604 ||  || — || February 7, 2002 || Kitt Peak || Spacewatch ||  || align=right | 1.6 km || 
|-id=605 bgcolor=#d6d6d6
| 567605 ||  || — || February 7, 2002 || Kitt Peak || Spacewatch ||  || align=right | 2.7 km || 
|-id=606 bgcolor=#fefefe
| 567606 ||  || — || February 7, 2002 || Palomar || NEAT ||  || align=right data-sort-value="0.62" | 620 m || 
|-id=607 bgcolor=#E9E9E9
| 567607 ||  || — || February 10, 2002 || Socorro || LINEAR || EUN || align=right | 1.3 km || 
|-id=608 bgcolor=#E9E9E9
| 567608 ||  || — || October 16, 2009 || Catalina || CSS ||  || align=right | 1.4 km || 
|-id=609 bgcolor=#d6d6d6
| 567609 ||  || — || February 6, 2002 || Palomar || NEAT ||  || align=right | 3.4 km || 
|-id=610 bgcolor=#E9E9E9
| 567610 ||  || — || April 22, 2007 || Kitt Peak || Spacewatch ||  || align=right | 1.1 km || 
|-id=611 bgcolor=#fefefe
| 567611 ||  || — || December 14, 2006 || Palomar || NEAT || H || align=right data-sort-value="0.88" | 880 m || 
|-id=612 bgcolor=#d6d6d6
| 567612 ||  || — || February 13, 2002 || Kitt Peak || Spacewatch ||  || align=right | 3.0 km || 
|-id=613 bgcolor=#E9E9E9
| 567613 ||  || — || December 24, 2005 || Kitt Peak || Spacewatch ||  || align=right | 1.2 km || 
|-id=614 bgcolor=#E9E9E9
| 567614 ||  || — || February 13, 2002 || Kitt Peak || Spacewatch ||  || align=right | 1.4 km || 
|-id=615 bgcolor=#d6d6d6
| 567615 ||  || — || February 21, 2002 || Kitt Peak || Spacewatch ||  || align=right | 2.9 km || 
|-id=616 bgcolor=#E9E9E9
| 567616 ||  || — || March 12, 2002 || Kitt Peak || Spacewatch ||  || align=right | 1.4 km || 
|-id=617 bgcolor=#d6d6d6
| 567617 ||  || — || January 27, 2007 || Mount Lemmon || Mount Lemmon Survey ||  || align=right | 2.3 km || 
|-id=618 bgcolor=#d6d6d6
| 567618 ||  || — || April 5, 2014 || Haleakala || Pan-STARRS ||  || align=right | 2.4 km || 
|-id=619 bgcolor=#d6d6d6
| 567619 ||  || — || June 14, 2015 || Mount Lemmon || Mount Lemmon Survey ||  || align=right | 3.4 km || 
|-id=620 bgcolor=#d6d6d6
| 567620 ||  || — || February 13, 2002 || Apache Point || SDSS Collaboration ||  || align=right | 2.6 km || 
|-id=621 bgcolor=#d6d6d6
| 567621 ||  || — || February 8, 2002 || Kitt Peak || R. Millis, M. W. Buie ||  || align=right | 2.2 km || 
|-id=622 bgcolor=#d6d6d6
| 567622 ||  || — || March 8, 2008 || Kitt Peak || Spacewatch ||  || align=right | 3.2 km || 
|-id=623 bgcolor=#fefefe
| 567623 ||  || — || March 8, 2013 || Haleakala || Pan-STARRS ||  || align=right data-sort-value="0.65" | 650 m || 
|-id=624 bgcolor=#d6d6d6
| 567624 ||  || — || September 30, 2011 || Mount Lemmon || Mount Lemmon Survey ||  || align=right | 2.3 km || 
|-id=625 bgcolor=#d6d6d6
| 567625 ||  || — || August 27, 2011 || Haleakala || Pan-STARRS ||  || align=right | 2.2 km || 
|-id=626 bgcolor=#fefefe
| 567626 ||  || — || October 25, 2011 || Haleakala || Pan-STARRS ||  || align=right data-sort-value="0.58" | 580 m || 
|-id=627 bgcolor=#d6d6d6
| 567627 ||  || — || October 28, 2017 || Haleakala || Pan-STARRS ||  || align=right | 2.3 km || 
|-id=628 bgcolor=#fefefe
| 567628 ||  || — || February 15, 2013 || Haleakala || Pan-STARRS ||  || align=right data-sort-value="0.54" | 540 m || 
|-id=629 bgcolor=#E9E9E9
| 567629 ||  || — || March 30, 2015 || Haleakala || Pan-STARRS ||  || align=right data-sort-value="0.82" | 820 m || 
|-id=630 bgcolor=#fefefe
| 567630 ||  || — || February 14, 2013 || Kitt Peak || Spacewatch ||  || align=right data-sort-value="0.64" | 640 m || 
|-id=631 bgcolor=#E9E9E9
| 567631 ||  || — || September 13, 2004 || Kitt Peak || Spacewatch ||  || align=right | 1.2 km || 
|-id=632 bgcolor=#d6d6d6
| 567632 ||  || — || February 13, 2002 || Apache Point || SDSS Collaboration ||  || align=right | 2.9 km || 
|-id=633 bgcolor=#d6d6d6
| 567633 ||  || — || September 24, 2011 || Haleakala || Pan-STARRS ||  || align=right | 2.4 km || 
|-id=634 bgcolor=#E9E9E9
| 567634 ||  || — || February 6, 2002 || Kitt Peak || R. Millis, M. W. Buie ||  || align=right | 1.9 km || 
|-id=635 bgcolor=#d6d6d6
| 567635 ||  || — || September 4, 2015 || Kitt Peak || Spacewatch ||  || align=right | 2.3 km || 
|-id=636 bgcolor=#d6d6d6
| 567636 ||  || — || May 28, 2014 || Mount Lemmon || Mount Lemmon Survey ||  || align=right | 2.2 km || 
|-id=637 bgcolor=#E9E9E9
| 567637 ||  || — || February 10, 2011 || Mount Lemmon || Mount Lemmon Survey ||  || align=right | 1.9 km || 
|-id=638 bgcolor=#d6d6d6
| 567638 ||  || — || February 13, 2002 || Apache Point || SDSS Collaboration ||  || align=right | 2.6 km || 
|-id=639 bgcolor=#d6d6d6
| 567639 ||  || — || February 12, 2002 || Kitt Peak || Spacewatch ||  || align=right | 2.7 km || 
|-id=640 bgcolor=#d6d6d6
| 567640 ||  || — || February 20, 2002 || Kitt Peak || Spacewatch ||  || align=right | 2.4 km || 
|-id=641 bgcolor=#d6d6d6
| 567641 ||  || — || December 22, 2012 || Haleakala || Pan-STARRS ||  || align=right | 2.7 km || 
|-id=642 bgcolor=#E9E9E9
| 567642 ||  || — || October 9, 2013 || Mount Lemmon || Mount Lemmon Survey ||  || align=right | 1.3 km || 
|-id=643 bgcolor=#d6d6d6
| 567643 ||  || — || February 20, 2002 || Kitt Peak || Spacewatch ||  || align=right | 2.5 km || 
|-id=644 bgcolor=#d6d6d6
| 567644 ||  || — || March 11, 2002 || Kitt Peak || Spacewatch ||  || align=right | 3.1 km || 
|-id=645 bgcolor=#E9E9E9
| 567645 ||  || — || March 12, 2002 || Palomar || NEAT ||  || align=right | 1.8 km || 
|-id=646 bgcolor=#fefefe
| 567646 ||  || — || March 9, 2002 || Kitt Peak || Spacewatch ||  || align=right data-sort-value="0.78" | 780 m || 
|-id=647 bgcolor=#d6d6d6
| 567647 ||  || — || March 11, 2002 || Kitt Peak || Spacewatch ||  || align=right | 2.6 km || 
|-id=648 bgcolor=#E9E9E9
| 567648 ||  || — || March 9, 2002 || Kitt Peak || Spacewatch ||  || align=right | 1.5 km || 
|-id=649 bgcolor=#E9E9E9
| 567649 ||  || — || March 3, 2002 || Haleakala || AMOS ||  || align=right | 2.2 km || 
|-id=650 bgcolor=#E9E9E9
| 567650 ||  || — || March 9, 2002 || Palomar || NEAT ||  || align=right | 2.0 km || 
|-id=651 bgcolor=#E9E9E9
| 567651 ||  || — || February 7, 2002 || Palomar || NEAT ||  || align=right | 1.8 km || 
|-id=652 bgcolor=#E9E9E9
| 567652 ||  || — || February 20, 2002 || Kitt Peak || Spacewatch ||  || align=right | 1.8 km || 
|-id=653 bgcolor=#E9E9E9
| 567653 ||  || — || March 6, 2002 || Palomar || NEAT ||  || align=right | 1.5 km || 
|-id=654 bgcolor=#d6d6d6
| 567654 ||  || — || February 6, 2002 || Palomar || NEAT || LIX || align=right | 2.9 km || 
|-id=655 bgcolor=#E9E9E9
| 567655 ||  || — || January 5, 2006 || Catalina || CSS || EUN || align=right | 1.1 km || 
|-id=656 bgcolor=#fefefe
| 567656 ||  || — || December 22, 2008 || Kitt Peak || Spacewatch ||  || align=right data-sort-value="0.63" | 630 m || 
|-id=657 bgcolor=#E9E9E9
| 567657 ||  || — || November 6, 2012 || Haleakala || Pan-STARRS ||  || align=right | 1.0 km || 
|-id=658 bgcolor=#d6d6d6
| 567658 ||  || — || April 8, 2008 || Kitt Peak || Spacewatch ||  || align=right | 2.7 km || 
|-id=659 bgcolor=#d6d6d6
| 567659 ||  || — || January 10, 2007 || Kitt Peak || Spacewatch ||  || align=right | 2.8 km || 
|-id=660 bgcolor=#d6d6d6
| 567660 ||  || — || March 6, 2013 || Haleakala || Pan-STARRS ||  || align=right | 2.6 km || 
|-id=661 bgcolor=#d6d6d6
| 567661 ||  || — || August 25, 2004 || Kitt Peak || Spacewatch ||  || align=right | 2.5 km || 
|-id=662 bgcolor=#d6d6d6
| 567662 ||  || — || October 25, 2011 || Haleakala || Pan-STARRS ||  || align=right | 2.8 km || 
|-id=663 bgcolor=#fefefe
| 567663 ||  || — || July 9, 2010 || Siding Spring || SSS ||  || align=right data-sort-value="0.98" | 980 m || 
|-id=664 bgcolor=#fefefe
| 567664 ||  || — || May 7, 2006 || Kitt Peak || Spacewatch ||  || align=right data-sort-value="0.72" | 720 m || 
|-id=665 bgcolor=#d6d6d6
| 567665 ||  || — || January 18, 2013 || Kitt Peak || Spacewatch ||  || align=right | 2.1 km || 
|-id=666 bgcolor=#E9E9E9
| 567666 ||  || — || January 28, 2006 || Mount Lemmon || Mount Lemmon Survey ||  || align=right | 1.3 km || 
|-id=667 bgcolor=#d6d6d6
| 567667 ||  || — || March 27, 2008 || Mount Lemmon || Mount Lemmon Survey ||  || align=right | 2.8 km || 
|-id=668 bgcolor=#E9E9E9
| 567668 ||  || — || June 3, 2016 || ESA OGS || ESA OGS ||  || align=right | 1.2 km || 
|-id=669 bgcolor=#fefefe
| 567669 ||  || — || October 26, 2011 || Haleakala || Pan-STARRS ||  || align=right data-sort-value="0.68" | 680 m || 
|-id=670 bgcolor=#d6d6d6
| 567670 ||  || — || August 8, 2016 || Haleakala || Pan-STARRS ||  || align=right | 2.4 km || 
|-id=671 bgcolor=#E9E9E9
| 567671 ||  || — || September 3, 2008 || Kitt Peak || Spacewatch ||  || align=right | 1.4 km || 
|-id=672 bgcolor=#d6d6d6
| 567672 ||  || — || September 20, 2011 || Mount Lemmon || Mount Lemmon Survey ||  || align=right | 2.3 km || 
|-id=673 bgcolor=#fefefe
| 567673 ||  || — || September 21, 2003 || Kitt Peak || Spacewatch ||  || align=right data-sort-value="0.67" | 670 m || 
|-id=674 bgcolor=#d6d6d6
| 567674 ||  || — || April 14, 2008 || Mount Lemmon || Mount Lemmon Survey ||  || align=right | 3.0 km || 
|-id=675 bgcolor=#d6d6d6
| 567675 ||  || — || October 24, 2015 || Haleakala || Pan-STARRS ||  || align=right | 2.7 km || 
|-id=676 bgcolor=#d6d6d6
| 567676 ||  || — || July 25, 2014 || Haleakala || Pan-STARRS ||  || align=right | 2.2 km || 
|-id=677 bgcolor=#d6d6d6
| 567677 ||  || — || January 27, 2007 || Kitt Peak || Spacewatch ||  || align=right | 2.9 km || 
|-id=678 bgcolor=#E9E9E9
| 567678 ||  || — || August 8, 2016 || Haleakala || Pan-STARRS ||  || align=right | 1.1 km || 
|-id=679 bgcolor=#d6d6d6
| 567679 ||  || — || October 10, 2004 || Kitt Peak || L. H. Wasserman, J. R. Lovering ||  || align=right | 2.1 km || 
|-id=680 bgcolor=#fefefe
| 567680 ||  || — || July 25, 2014 || Haleakala || Pan-STARRS ||  || align=right data-sort-value="0.56" | 560 m || 
|-id=681 bgcolor=#E9E9E9
| 567681 ||  || — || March 6, 2002 || Palomar || NEAT ||  || align=right | 2.4 km || 
|-id=682 bgcolor=#E9E9E9
| 567682 ||  || — || March 18, 2002 || Kitt Peak || M. W. Buie, D. E. Trilling ||  || align=right | 1.4 km || 
|-id=683 bgcolor=#d6d6d6
| 567683 ||  || — || March 5, 2013 || Mount Lemmon || Mount Lemmon Survey ||  || align=right | 2.6 km || 
|-id=684 bgcolor=#d6d6d6
| 567684 ||  || — || September 5, 2010 || Mount Lemmon || Mount Lemmon Survey ||  || align=right | 2.9 km || 
|-id=685 bgcolor=#E9E9E9
| 567685 ||  || — || January 7, 2006 || Mount Lemmon || Mount Lemmon Survey ||  || align=right | 1.1 km || 
|-id=686 bgcolor=#E9E9E9
| 567686 ||  || — || March 21, 2002 || Kitt Peak || Spacewatch ||  || align=right | 1.8 km || 
|-id=687 bgcolor=#d6d6d6
| 567687 ||  || — || February 17, 2013 || Mount Lemmon || Mount Lemmon Survey ||  || align=right | 2.7 km || 
|-id=688 bgcolor=#fefefe
| 567688 ||  || — || September 9, 2007 || Mount Lemmon || Mount Lemmon Survey ||  || align=right data-sort-value="0.59" | 590 m || 
|-id=689 bgcolor=#d6d6d6
| 567689 ||  || — || April 2, 2002 || Kitt Peak || Spacewatch || 7:4 || align=right | 2.8 km || 
|-id=690 bgcolor=#d6d6d6
| 567690 ||  || — || April 8, 2002 || Kitt Peak || Spacewatch ||  || align=right | 3.0 km || 
|-id=691 bgcolor=#fefefe
| 567691 ||  || — || April 13, 2002 || Palomar || NEAT ||  || align=right data-sort-value="0.82" | 820 m || 
|-id=692 bgcolor=#E9E9E9
| 567692 ||  || — || October 23, 2008 || Mount Lemmon || Mount Lemmon Survey || NEM || align=right | 2.1 km || 
|-id=693 bgcolor=#fefefe
| 567693 ||  || — || April 8, 2002 || Palomar || NEAT ||  || align=right data-sort-value="0.67" | 670 m || 
|-id=694 bgcolor=#E9E9E9
| 567694 ||  || — || February 25, 2006 || Kitt Peak || Spacewatch ||  || align=right | 1.0 km || 
|-id=695 bgcolor=#E9E9E9
| 567695 ||  || — || January 26, 2006 || Mount Lemmon || Mount Lemmon Survey || AEO || align=right | 1.3 km || 
|-id=696 bgcolor=#d6d6d6
| 567696 ||  || — || October 21, 2011 || Kitt Peak || Spacewatch ||  || align=right | 3.2 km || 
|-id=697 bgcolor=#d6d6d6
| 567697 ||  || — || February 8, 2013 || Kitt Peak || Spacewatch ||  || align=right | 2.5 km || 
|-id=698 bgcolor=#E9E9E9
| 567698 ||  || — || February 11, 2014 || Mount Lemmon || Mount Lemmon Survey ||  || align=right | 1.2 km || 
|-id=699 bgcolor=#d6d6d6
| 567699 ||  || — || April 17, 2002 || Kitt Peak || Spacewatch ||  || align=right | 2.7 km || 
|-id=700 bgcolor=#d6d6d6
| 567700 ||  || — || June 3, 2008 || Kitt Peak || Spacewatch ||  || align=right | 2.5 km || 
|}

567701–567800 

|-bgcolor=#E9E9E9
| 567701 ||  || — || October 2, 2008 || Kitt Peak || Spacewatch ||  || align=right | 2.1 km || 
|-id=702 bgcolor=#E9E9E9
| 567702 ||  || — || October 7, 2013 || Kitt Peak || Spacewatch ||  || align=right | 1.8 km || 
|-id=703 bgcolor=#E9E9E9
| 567703 ||  || — || September 23, 2008 || Mount Lemmon || Mount Lemmon Survey ||  || align=right | 1.2 km || 
|-id=704 bgcolor=#d6d6d6
| 567704 ||  || — || October 17, 2010 || Mount Lemmon || Mount Lemmon Survey ||  || align=right | 2.0 km || 
|-id=705 bgcolor=#E9E9E9
| 567705 ||  || — || April 5, 2011 || Catalina || CSS ||  || align=right | 2.0 km || 
|-id=706 bgcolor=#E9E9E9
| 567706 ||  || — || October 30, 2017 || Haleakala || Pan-STARRS ||  || align=right | 1.0 km || 
|-id=707 bgcolor=#d6d6d6
| 567707 ||  || — || October 1, 2011 || Kitt Peak || Spacewatch ||  || align=right | 3.0 km || 
|-id=708 bgcolor=#fefefe
| 567708 ||  || — || March 20, 2002 || Kitt Peak || Spacewatch ||  || align=right data-sort-value="0.69" | 690 m || 
|-id=709 bgcolor=#E9E9E9
| 567709 ||  || — || April 14, 2002 || Socorro || LINEAR ||  || align=right | 2.1 km || 
|-id=710 bgcolor=#fefefe
| 567710 ||  || — || May 4, 2002 || Kitt Peak || Spacewatch ||  || align=right data-sort-value="0.77" | 770 m || 
|-id=711 bgcolor=#E9E9E9
| 567711 ||  || — || May 11, 2002 || Socorro || LINEAR ||  || align=right | 1.6 km || 
|-id=712 bgcolor=#E9E9E9
| 567712 ||  || — || April 12, 2002 || Palomar || NEAT ||  || align=right | 2.4 km || 
|-id=713 bgcolor=#E9E9E9
| 567713 ||  || — || May 5, 2002 || Palomar || NEAT ||  || align=right | 2.7 km || 
|-id=714 bgcolor=#fefefe
| 567714 ||  || — || May 9, 2002 || Palomar || NEAT ||  || align=right data-sort-value="0.80" | 800 m || 
|-id=715 bgcolor=#d6d6d6
| 567715 ||  || — || May 10, 2002 || Kitt Peak || Spacewatch ||  || align=right | 2.5 km || 
|-id=716 bgcolor=#E9E9E9
| 567716 ||  || — || May 10, 2002 || Kitt Peak || Spacewatch ||  || align=right | 2.0 km || 
|-id=717 bgcolor=#E9E9E9
| 567717 ||  || — || May 13, 2002 || Palomar || NEAT ||  || align=right | 2.3 km || 
|-id=718 bgcolor=#E9E9E9
| 567718 ||  || — || April 5, 2011 || Catalina || CSS ||  || align=right | 2.5 km || 
|-id=719 bgcolor=#fefefe
| 567719 ||  || — || January 20, 2015 || Haleakala || Pan-STARRS ||  || align=right data-sort-value="0.94" | 940 m || 
|-id=720 bgcolor=#fefefe
| 567720 ||  || — || March 3, 2009 || Kitt Peak || Spacewatch ||  || align=right data-sort-value="0.72" | 720 m || 
|-id=721 bgcolor=#E9E9E9
| 567721 ||  || — || March 28, 2015 || Haleakala || Pan-STARRS ||  || align=right | 1.3 km || 
|-id=722 bgcolor=#fefefe
| 567722 ||  || — || August 16, 2006 || Palomar || NEAT ||  || align=right data-sort-value="0.52" | 520 m || 
|-id=723 bgcolor=#fefefe
| 567723 ||  || — || March 17, 2009 || Catalina || CSS ||  || align=right data-sort-value="0.90" | 900 m || 
|-id=724 bgcolor=#fefefe
| 567724 ||  || — || September 18, 2006 || Kitt Peak || Spacewatch ||  || align=right data-sort-value="0.62" | 620 m || 
|-id=725 bgcolor=#E9E9E9
| 567725 ||  || — || January 28, 2014 || Mount Lemmon || Mount Lemmon Survey ||  || align=right | 1.1 km || 
|-id=726 bgcolor=#d6d6d6
| 567726 ||  || — || October 1, 2010 || Mount Lemmon || Mount Lemmon Survey ||  || align=right | 2.7 km || 
|-id=727 bgcolor=#d6d6d6
| 567727 ||  || — || April 10, 2013 || Haleakala || Pan-STARRS ||  || align=right | 2.8 km || 
|-id=728 bgcolor=#E9E9E9
| 567728 ||  || — || May 13, 2002 || Palomar || NEAT ||  || align=right | 2.0 km || 
|-id=729 bgcolor=#E9E9E9
| 567729 ||  || — || May 18, 2002 || Palomar || NEAT ||  || align=right | 1.4 km || 
|-id=730 bgcolor=#E9E9E9
| 567730 ||  || — || September 26, 2003 || Apache Point || SDSS Collaboration || DOR || align=right | 2.1 km || 
|-id=731 bgcolor=#fefefe
| 567731 ||  || — || May 7, 2010 || Mount Lemmon || Mount Lemmon Survey || H || align=right data-sort-value="0.75" | 750 m || 
|-id=732 bgcolor=#E9E9E9
| 567732 ||  || — || March 27, 2011 || Mount Lemmon || Mount Lemmon Survey ||  || align=right | 1.9 km || 
|-id=733 bgcolor=#E9E9E9
| 567733 ||  || — || February 11, 2011 || Mount Lemmon || Mount Lemmon Survey ||  || align=right | 1.7 km || 
|-id=734 bgcolor=#d6d6d6
| 567734 ||  || — || November 28, 2010 || Mount Lemmon || Mount Lemmon Survey ||  || align=right | 3.3 km || 
|-id=735 bgcolor=#E9E9E9
| 567735 ||  || — || June 9, 2002 || Socorro || LINEAR ||  || align=right | 2.8 km || 
|-id=736 bgcolor=#E9E9E9
| 567736 ||  || — || October 7, 2008 || Mount Lemmon || Mount Lemmon Survey ||  || align=right | 2.8 km || 
|-id=737 bgcolor=#E9E9E9
| 567737 ||  || — || December 21, 2004 || Kitt Peak || Spacewatch ||  || align=right | 2.8 km || 
|-id=738 bgcolor=#fefefe
| 567738 ||  || — || March 1, 2005 || Catalina || CSS ||  || align=right | 1.1 km || 
|-id=739 bgcolor=#E9E9E9
| 567739 ||  || — || May 22, 2011 || Kitt Peak || Spacewatch ||  || align=right | 2.0 km || 
|-id=740 bgcolor=#E9E9E9
| 567740 ||  || — || October 18, 2012 || Mount Lemmon || Mount Lemmon Survey ||  || align=right | 2.2 km || 
|-id=741 bgcolor=#E9E9E9
| 567741 ||  || — || October 12, 2007 || Mount Lemmon || Mount Lemmon Survey ||  || align=right | 2.2 km || 
|-id=742 bgcolor=#fefefe
| 567742 ||  || — || July 11, 2002 || Campo Imperatore || CINEOS ||  || align=right data-sort-value="0.55" | 550 m || 
|-id=743 bgcolor=#d6d6d6
| 567743 ||  || — || August 6, 2002 || Palomar || NEAT ||  || align=right | 2.9 km || 
|-id=744 bgcolor=#fefefe
| 567744 ||  || — || August 9, 2002 || Haleakala || AMOS ||  || align=right data-sort-value="0.88" | 880 m || 
|-id=745 bgcolor=#fefefe
| 567745 ||  || — || July 5, 2002 || Palomar || NEAT ||  || align=right data-sort-value="0.44" | 440 m || 
|-id=746 bgcolor=#E9E9E9
| 567746 ||  || — || April 25, 2006 || Kitt Peak || Spacewatch ||  || align=right | 1.6 km || 
|-id=747 bgcolor=#d6d6d6
| 567747 ||  || — || November 24, 2009 || Kitt Peak || Spacewatch ||  || align=right | 2.8 km || 
|-id=748 bgcolor=#fefefe
| 567748 ||  || — || April 19, 2009 || Kitt Peak || Spacewatch ||  || align=right data-sort-value="0.82" | 820 m || 
|-id=749 bgcolor=#E9E9E9
| 567749 ||  || — || July 8, 2002 || Palomar || NEAT ||  || align=right | 2.3 km || 
|-id=750 bgcolor=#fefefe
| 567750 ||  || — || May 30, 2009 || Mount Lemmon || Mount Lemmon Survey ||  || align=right data-sort-value="0.91" | 910 m || 
|-id=751 bgcolor=#E9E9E9
| 567751 ||  || — || September 13, 2007 || Mount Lemmon || Mount Lemmon Survey ||  || align=right | 2.0 km || 
|-id=752 bgcolor=#E9E9E9
| 567752 ||  || — || August 1, 2011 || Haleakala || Pan-STARRS ||  || align=right | 1.7 km || 
|-id=753 bgcolor=#E9E9E9
| 567753 ||  || — || July 4, 2002 || Palomar || NEAT ||  || align=right data-sort-value="0.66" | 660 m || 
|-id=754 bgcolor=#fefefe
| 567754 ||  || — || November 8, 2007 || Kitt Peak || Spacewatch ||  || align=right data-sort-value="0.97" | 970 m || 
|-id=755 bgcolor=#E9E9E9
| 567755 ||  || — || April 8, 2006 || Kitt Peak || Spacewatch ||  || align=right | 1.2 km || 
|-id=756 bgcolor=#fefefe
| 567756 ||  || — || March 30, 2011 || Haleakala || Pan-STARRS ||  || align=right data-sort-value="0.72" | 720 m || 
|-id=757 bgcolor=#fefefe
| 567757 ||  || — || November 3, 2010 || Mount Lemmon || Mount Lemmon Survey ||  || align=right data-sort-value="0.70" | 700 m || 
|-id=758 bgcolor=#fefefe
| 567758 ||  || — || March 13, 2005 || Kitt Peak || Spacewatch ||  || align=right data-sort-value="0.65" | 650 m || 
|-id=759 bgcolor=#d6d6d6
| 567759 ||  || — || September 6, 2008 || Mount Lemmon || Mount Lemmon Survey ||  || align=right | 2.8 km || 
|-id=760 bgcolor=#E9E9E9
| 567760 ||  || — || August 5, 2002 || Palomar || NEAT ||  || align=right | 1.3 km || 
|-id=761 bgcolor=#E9E9E9
| 567761 ||  || — || August 24, 2007 || Kitt Peak || Spacewatch ||  || align=right | 2.1 km || 
|-id=762 bgcolor=#fefefe
| 567762 ||  || — || March 9, 2005 || Mount Lemmon || Mount Lemmon Survey ||  || align=right data-sort-value="0.70" | 700 m || 
|-id=763 bgcolor=#fefefe
| 567763 ||  || — || December 13, 2010 || Mount Lemmon || Mount Lemmon Survey || V || align=right data-sort-value="0.51" | 510 m || 
|-id=764 bgcolor=#E9E9E9
| 567764 ||  || — || August 5, 2002 || Palomar || NEAT ||  || align=right data-sort-value="0.90" | 900 m || 
|-id=765 bgcolor=#fefefe
| 567765 ||  || — || July 21, 2002 || Palomar || NEAT ||  || align=right data-sort-value="0.77" | 770 m || 
|-id=766 bgcolor=#E9E9E9
| 567766 ||  || — || August 5, 2002 || Palomar || NEAT ||  || align=right | 2.2 km || 
|-id=767 bgcolor=#E9E9E9
| 567767 ||  || — || August 6, 2002 || Palomar || NEAT ||  || align=right | 1.5 km || 
|-id=768 bgcolor=#fefefe
| 567768 ||  || — || July 12, 2002 || Palomar || NEAT || H || align=right data-sort-value="0.97" | 970 m || 
|-id=769 bgcolor=#d6d6d6
| 567769 ||  || — || July 12, 2002 || Palomar || NEAT ||  || align=right | 3.1 km || 
|-id=770 bgcolor=#d6d6d6
| 567770 ||  || — || August 6, 2002 || Palomar || NEAT ||  || align=right | 3.1 km || 
|-id=771 bgcolor=#E9E9E9
| 567771 ||  || — || August 6, 2002 || Palomar || NEAT ||  || align=right | 3.2 km || 
|-id=772 bgcolor=#fefefe
| 567772 ||  || — || July 18, 2002 || Palomar || NEAT ||  || align=right data-sort-value="0.90" | 900 m || 
|-id=773 bgcolor=#fefefe
| 567773 ||  || — || August 15, 2002 || Palomar || NEAT ||  || align=right data-sort-value="0.71" | 710 m || 
|-id=774 bgcolor=#fefefe
| 567774 ||  || — || August 9, 2002 || Cerro Tololo || M. W. Buie, S. D. Kern ||  || align=right data-sort-value="0.98" | 980 m || 
|-id=775 bgcolor=#E9E9E9
| 567775 ||  || — || August 9, 2002 || Cerro Tololo || M. W. Buie, S. D. Kern ||  || align=right | 1.8 km || 
|-id=776 bgcolor=#E9E9E9
| 567776 ||  || — || August 15, 2002 || Palomar || NEAT ||  || align=right | 1.3 km || 
|-id=777 bgcolor=#fefefe
| 567777 ||  || — || August 16, 2002 || Haleakala || AMOS || H || align=right data-sort-value="0.48" | 480 m || 
|-id=778 bgcolor=#E9E9E9
| 567778 ||  || — || July 15, 2002 || Palomar || NEAT ||  || align=right data-sort-value="0.90" | 900 m || 
|-id=779 bgcolor=#E9E9E9
| 567779 ||  || — || November 18, 2007 || Mount Lemmon || Mount Lemmon Survey ||  || align=right | 1.2 km || 
|-id=780 bgcolor=#E9E9E9
| 567780 ||  || — || October 10, 2007 || Kitt Peak || Spacewatch ||  || align=right | 1.2 km || 
|-id=781 bgcolor=#E9E9E9
| 567781 ||  || — || June 1, 2006 || Kitt Peak || Spacewatch ||  || align=right data-sort-value="0.92" | 920 m || 
|-id=782 bgcolor=#E9E9E9
| 567782 ||  || — || January 8, 2010 || Mount Lemmon || Mount Lemmon Survey || GEF || align=right | 1.4 km || 
|-id=783 bgcolor=#fefefe
| 567783 ||  || — || August 11, 2002 || Palomar || NEAT ||  || align=right data-sort-value="0.86" | 860 m || 
|-id=784 bgcolor=#fefefe
| 567784 ||  || — || October 3, 2006 || Mount Lemmon || Mount Lemmon Survey ||  || align=right data-sort-value="0.73" | 730 m || 
|-id=785 bgcolor=#E9E9E9
| 567785 ||  || — || August 4, 2002 || Palomar || NEAT ||  || align=right | 1.5 km || 
|-id=786 bgcolor=#fefefe
| 567786 ||  || — || August 19, 2002 || Palomar || NEAT ||  || align=right data-sort-value="0.58" | 580 m || 
|-id=787 bgcolor=#FA8072
| 567787 ||  || — || August 13, 2002 || Palomar || NEAT ||  || align=right data-sort-value="0.63" | 630 m || 
|-id=788 bgcolor=#fefefe
| 567788 ||  || — || August 19, 2002 || Palomar || NEAT || H || align=right data-sort-value="0.48" | 480 m || 
|-id=789 bgcolor=#fefefe
| 567789 ||  || — || August 8, 2002 || Palomar || NEAT ||  || align=right data-sort-value="0.54" | 540 m || 
|-id=790 bgcolor=#d6d6d6
| 567790 ||  || — || August 12, 2002 || Cerro Tololo || M. W. Buie, S. D. Kern ||  || align=right | 3.5 km || 
|-id=791 bgcolor=#E9E9E9
| 567791 ||  || — || August 8, 2002 || Palomar || NEAT ||  || align=right | 1.6 km || 
|-id=792 bgcolor=#d6d6d6
| 567792 ||  || — || August 18, 2002 || Palomar || NEAT ||  || align=right | 3.1 km || 
|-id=793 bgcolor=#fefefe
| 567793 ||  || — || August 16, 2002 || Haleakala || AMOS || H || align=right data-sort-value="0.62" | 620 m || 
|-id=794 bgcolor=#fefefe
| 567794 ||  || — || August 16, 2002 || Palomar || NEAT || H || align=right data-sort-value="0.57" | 570 m || 
|-id=795 bgcolor=#E9E9E9
| 567795 ||  || — || March 4, 2005 || Mount Lemmon || Mount Lemmon Survey ||  || align=right | 2.4 km || 
|-id=796 bgcolor=#E9E9E9
| 567796 ||  || — || August 19, 2002 || Palomar || NEAT || AGN || align=right | 1.1 km || 
|-id=797 bgcolor=#fefefe
| 567797 ||  || — || August 27, 2002 || Palomar || NEAT ||  || align=right data-sort-value="0.82" | 820 m || 
|-id=798 bgcolor=#E9E9E9
| 567798 ||  || — || July 29, 2002 || Palomar || NEAT ||  || align=right | 1.9 km || 
|-id=799 bgcolor=#d6d6d6
| 567799 ||  || — || August 16, 2002 || Palomar || NEAT ||  || align=right | 2.6 km || 
|-id=800 bgcolor=#E9E9E9
| 567800 ||  || — || July 22, 2002 || Palomar || NEAT ||  || align=right | 1.1 km || 
|}

567801–567900 

|-bgcolor=#fefefe
| 567801 ||  || — || August 9, 2002 || Cerro Tololo || M. W. Buie, S. D. Kern ||  || align=right data-sort-value="0.72" | 720 m || 
|-id=802 bgcolor=#d6d6d6
| 567802 ||  || — || October 5, 2002 || Apache Point || SDSS Collaboration ||  || align=right | 3.3 km || 
|-id=803 bgcolor=#d6d6d6
| 567803 ||  || — || August 16, 2002 || Palomar || NEAT ||  || align=right | 1.9 km || 
|-id=804 bgcolor=#d6d6d6
| 567804 ||  || — || August 8, 2002 || Palomar || NEAT ||  || align=right | 2.9 km || 
|-id=805 bgcolor=#fefefe
| 567805 ||  || — || October 2, 2006 || Mount Lemmon || Mount Lemmon Survey ||  || align=right data-sort-value="0.61" | 610 m || 
|-id=806 bgcolor=#d6d6d6
| 567806 ||  || — || October 10, 2007 || Mount Lemmon || Mount Lemmon Survey ||  || align=right | 2.1 km || 
|-id=807 bgcolor=#d6d6d6
| 567807 ||  || — || December 20, 2009 || Kitt Peak || Spacewatch ||  || align=right | 2.7 km || 
|-id=808 bgcolor=#E9E9E9
| 567808 ||  || — || March 16, 2010 || Mount Lemmon || Mount Lemmon Survey || AGN || align=right | 1.4 km || 
|-id=809 bgcolor=#d6d6d6
| 567809 ||  || — || September 9, 2007 || La Palma || La Palma Obs. || BRA || align=right | 1.5 km || 
|-id=810 bgcolor=#d6d6d6
| 567810 ||  || — || June 3, 2011 || Mount Lemmon || Mount Lemmon Survey ||  || align=right | 2.2 km || 
|-id=811 bgcolor=#d6d6d6
| 567811 ||  || — || December 22, 2008 || Kitt Peak || Spacewatch ||  || align=right | 3.0 km || 
|-id=812 bgcolor=#E9E9E9
| 567812 ||  || — || November 29, 2011 || Kitt Peak || Spacewatch ||  || align=right | 1.3 km || 
|-id=813 bgcolor=#E9E9E9
| 567813 ||  || — || August 28, 2002 || Palomar || NEAT ||  || align=right | 1.0 km || 
|-id=814 bgcolor=#d6d6d6
| 567814 ||  || — || September 25, 2012 || Mount Lemmon || Mount Lemmon Survey ||  || align=right | 1.8 km || 
|-id=815 bgcolor=#fefefe
| 567815 ||  || — || November 9, 2013 || Haleakala || Pan-STARRS ||  || align=right data-sort-value="0.68" | 680 m || 
|-id=816 bgcolor=#fefefe
| 567816 ||  || — || February 26, 2014 || Haleakala || Pan-STARRS ||  || align=right data-sort-value="0.56" | 560 m || 
|-id=817 bgcolor=#fefefe
| 567817 ||  || — || August 16, 2002 || Kitt Peak || Spacewatch ||  || align=right data-sort-value="0.85" | 850 m || 
|-id=818 bgcolor=#E9E9E9
| 567818 ||  || — || August 29, 2002 || Palomar || NEAT ||  || align=right | 2.5 km || 
|-id=819 bgcolor=#fefefe
| 567819 ||  || — || September 5, 2002 || Socorro || LINEAR ||  || align=right data-sort-value="0.69" | 690 m || 
|-id=820 bgcolor=#d6d6d6
| 567820 ||  || — || September 3, 2002 || Palomar || NEAT ||  || align=right | 3.5 km || 
|-id=821 bgcolor=#E9E9E9
| 567821 ||  || — || September 4, 2002 || Palomar || NEAT ||  || align=right | 2.8 km || 
|-id=822 bgcolor=#E9E9E9
| 567822 ||  || — || September 11, 2002 || Palomar || NEAT ||  || align=right | 1.3 km || 
|-id=823 bgcolor=#fefefe
| 567823 ||  || — || September 11, 2002 || Palomar || NEAT ||  || align=right data-sort-value="0.65" | 650 m || 
|-id=824 bgcolor=#fefefe
| 567824 ||  || — || September 13, 2002 || Palomar || NEAT ||  || align=right data-sort-value="0.68" | 680 m || 
|-id=825 bgcolor=#fefefe
| 567825 ||  || — || September 13, 2002 || Palomar || NEAT ||  || align=right data-sort-value="0.65" | 650 m || 
|-id=826 bgcolor=#fefefe
| 567826 ||  || — || September 12, 2002 || Palomar || NEAT ||  || align=right data-sort-value="0.64" | 640 m || 
|-id=827 bgcolor=#fefefe
| 567827 ||  || — || September 13, 2002 || Palomar || NEAT ||  || align=right data-sort-value="0.75" | 750 m || 
|-id=828 bgcolor=#E9E9E9
| 567828 ||  || — || September 14, 2002 || Palomar || NEAT || EUN || align=right | 1.2 km || 
|-id=829 bgcolor=#fefefe
| 567829 ||  || — || August 17, 2002 || Palomar || NEAT ||  || align=right data-sort-value="0.65" | 650 m || 
|-id=830 bgcolor=#fefefe
| 567830 ||  || — || August 16, 2002 || Palomar || NEAT ||  || align=right data-sort-value="0.62" | 620 m || 
|-id=831 bgcolor=#d6d6d6
| 567831 ||  || — || August 18, 2002 || Palomar || NEAT ||  || align=right | 2.6 km || 
|-id=832 bgcolor=#d6d6d6
| 567832 ||  || — || September 12, 2002 || Haleakala || AMOS ||  || align=right | 2.7 km || 
|-id=833 bgcolor=#d6d6d6
| 567833 ||  || — || December 1, 2003 || Kitt Peak || Spacewatch ||  || align=right | 2.8 km || 
|-id=834 bgcolor=#E9E9E9
| 567834 ||  || — || May 21, 2006 || Kitt Peak || Spacewatch || AGN || align=right | 1.0 km || 
|-id=835 bgcolor=#fefefe
| 567835 ||  || — || October 11, 2002 || Apache Point || SDSS Collaboration ||  || align=right data-sort-value="0.56" | 560 m || 
|-id=836 bgcolor=#fefefe
| 567836 ||  || — || June 5, 2005 || Kitt Peak || Spacewatch ||  || align=right | 1.0 km || 
|-id=837 bgcolor=#d6d6d6
| 567837 ||  || — || October 9, 2008 || Mount Lemmon || Mount Lemmon Survey ||  || align=right | 2.2 km || 
|-id=838 bgcolor=#d6d6d6
| 567838 ||  || — || September 11, 2007 || Mount Lemmon || Mount Lemmon Survey ||  || align=right | 2.0 km || 
|-id=839 bgcolor=#d6d6d6
| 567839 ||  || — || September 13, 2007 || Mount Lemmon || Mount Lemmon Survey ||  || align=right | 1.8 km || 
|-id=840 bgcolor=#d6d6d6
| 567840 ||  || — || March 4, 2010 || Kitt Peak || Spacewatch ||  || align=right | 2.7 km || 
|-id=841 bgcolor=#E9E9E9
| 567841 ||  || — || October 7, 2007 || Catalina || CSS ||  || align=right | 2.8 km || 
|-id=842 bgcolor=#d6d6d6
| 567842 ||  || — || September 11, 2007 || XuYi || PMO NEO || BRA || align=right | 1.3 km || 
|-id=843 bgcolor=#fefefe
| 567843 ||  || — || February 23, 2012 || Catalina || CSS || H || align=right data-sort-value="0.65" | 650 m || 
|-id=844 bgcolor=#fefefe
| 567844 ||  || — || May 17, 2012 || Mount Lemmon || Mount Lemmon Survey ||  || align=right data-sort-value="0.82" | 820 m || 
|-id=845 bgcolor=#fefefe
| 567845 ||  || — || March 1, 2008 || Mount Lemmon || Mount Lemmon Survey ||  || align=right | 1.2 km || 
|-id=846 bgcolor=#fefefe
| 567846 ||  || — || September 28, 2006 || Catalina || CSS ||  || align=right | 1.0 km || 
|-id=847 bgcolor=#d6d6d6
| 567847 ||  || — || September 15, 2012 || Catalina || CSS ||  || align=right | 3.4 km || 
|-id=848 bgcolor=#d6d6d6
| 567848 ||  || — || January 24, 2015 || Mount Lemmon || Mount Lemmon Survey ||  || align=right | 2.3 km || 
|-id=849 bgcolor=#fefefe
| 567849 ||  || — || January 6, 2010 || Kitt Peak || Spacewatch ||  || align=right data-sort-value="0.60" | 600 m || 
|-id=850 bgcolor=#E9E9E9
| 567850 ||  || — || October 25, 2016 || Haleakala || Pan-STARRS ||  || align=right | 1.8 km || 
|-id=851 bgcolor=#d6d6d6
| 567851 ||  || — || December 29, 2003 || Kitt Peak || Spacewatch ||  || align=right | 3.0 km || 
|-id=852 bgcolor=#fefefe
| 567852 ||  || — || November 20, 2009 || Kitt Peak || Spacewatch ||  || align=right data-sort-value="0.85" | 850 m || 
|-id=853 bgcolor=#d6d6d6
| 567853 ||  || — || October 8, 2012 || Mount Lemmon || Mount Lemmon Survey ||  || align=right | 1.6 km || 
|-id=854 bgcolor=#E9E9E9
| 567854 ||  || — || September 27, 2002 || Palomar || NEAT ||  || align=right | 1.4 km || 
|-id=855 bgcolor=#fefefe
| 567855 ||  || — || March 16, 2004 || Kitt Peak || Spacewatch ||  || align=right data-sort-value="0.64" | 640 m || 
|-id=856 bgcolor=#fefefe
| 567856 ||  || — || October 2, 2002 || Socorro || LINEAR ||  || align=right data-sort-value="0.72" | 720 m || 
|-id=857 bgcolor=#fefefe
| 567857 ||  || — || October 3, 2002 || Campo Imperatore || CINEOS ||  || align=right data-sort-value="0.66" | 660 m || 
|-id=858 bgcolor=#fefefe
| 567858 ||  || — || October 4, 2002 || Socorro || LINEAR || H || align=right data-sort-value="0.58" | 580 m || 
|-id=859 bgcolor=#fefefe
| 567859 ||  || — || October 3, 2002 || Palomar || NEAT ||  || align=right | 1.0 km || 
|-id=860 bgcolor=#d6d6d6
| 567860 ||  || — || October 4, 2002 || Palomar || NEAT ||  || align=right | 2.0 km || 
|-id=861 bgcolor=#d6d6d6
| 567861 ||  || — || October 5, 2002 || Palomar || NEAT || BRA || align=right | 1.6 km || 
|-id=862 bgcolor=#d6d6d6
| 567862 ||  || — || October 5, 2002 || Socorro || LINEAR || EOS || align=right | 2.5 km || 
|-id=863 bgcolor=#d6d6d6
| 567863 ||  || — || October 6, 2002 || Socorro || LINEAR ||  || align=right | 2.8 km || 
|-id=864 bgcolor=#d6d6d6
| 567864 ||  || — || October 5, 2002 || Palomar || NEAT ||  || align=right | 2.1 km || 
|-id=865 bgcolor=#fefefe
| 567865 ||  || — || February 25, 2007 || Mount Lemmon || Mount Lemmon Survey ||  || align=right data-sort-value="0.69" | 690 m || 
|-id=866 bgcolor=#E9E9E9
| 567866 ||  || — || November 18, 2007 || Mount Lemmon || Mount Lemmon Survey ||  || align=right | 2.1 km || 
|-id=867 bgcolor=#E9E9E9
| 567867 ||  || — || March 19, 2009 || Mount Lemmon || Mount Lemmon Survey ||  || align=right | 1.4 km || 
|-id=868 bgcolor=#E9E9E9
| 567868 ||  || — || February 6, 2014 || Mount Lemmon || Mount Lemmon Survey ||  || align=right | 3.0 km || 
|-id=869 bgcolor=#fefefe
| 567869 ||  || — || January 16, 2004 || Palomar || NEAT ||  || align=right | 1.6 km || 
|-id=870 bgcolor=#d6d6d6
| 567870 ||  || — || September 24, 2007 || Kitt Peak || Spacewatch ||  || align=right | 1.9 km || 
|-id=871 bgcolor=#E9E9E9
| 567871 ||  || — || October 14, 1998 || Caussols || ODAS ||  || align=right data-sort-value="0.98" | 980 m || 
|-id=872 bgcolor=#fefefe
| 567872 ||  || — || October 3, 2002 || Campo Imperatore || CINEOS ||  || align=right data-sort-value="0.71" | 710 m || 
|-id=873 bgcolor=#d6d6d6
| 567873 ||  || — || August 13, 2012 || Haleakala || Pan-STARRS ||  || align=right | 2.1 km || 
|-id=874 bgcolor=#fefefe
| 567874 ||  || — || November 26, 2012 || Mount Lemmon || Mount Lemmon Survey ||  || align=right data-sort-value="0.56" | 560 m || 
|-id=875 bgcolor=#d6d6d6
| 567875 ||  || — || September 10, 2007 || Mount Lemmon || Mount Lemmon Survey ||  || align=right | 2.2 km || 
|-id=876 bgcolor=#fefefe
| 567876 ||  || — || September 3, 2005 || Palomar || NEAT ||  || align=right data-sort-value="0.67" | 670 m || 
|-id=877 bgcolor=#fefefe
| 567877 ||  || — || October 30, 2002 || Kitt Peak || Spacewatch ||  || align=right data-sort-value="0.75" | 750 m || 
|-id=878 bgcolor=#d6d6d6
| 567878 ||  || — || October 31, 2002 || Socorro || LINEAR ||  || align=right | 3.0 km || 
|-id=879 bgcolor=#d6d6d6
| 567879 ||  || — || January 27, 2015 || Haleakala || Pan-STARRS ||  || align=right | 2.8 km || 
|-id=880 bgcolor=#d6d6d6
| 567880 ||  || — || November 14, 2002 || Kitt Peak || Spacewatch || EOS || align=right | 1.8 km || 
|-id=881 bgcolor=#fefefe
| 567881 ||  || — || November 7, 2002 || Anderson Mesa || LONEOS ||  || align=right data-sort-value="0.79" | 790 m || 
|-id=882 bgcolor=#fefefe
| 567882 ||  || — || April 29, 2014 || Haleakala || Pan-STARRS ||  || align=right data-sort-value="0.58" | 580 m || 
|-id=883 bgcolor=#fefefe
| 567883 ||  || — || April 13, 2008 || Mount Lemmon || Mount Lemmon Survey ||  || align=right data-sort-value="0.88" | 880 m || 
|-id=884 bgcolor=#fefefe
| 567884 ||  || — || December 20, 2009 || Mount Lemmon || Mount Lemmon Survey ||  || align=right data-sort-value="0.69" | 690 m || 
|-id=885 bgcolor=#d6d6d6
| 567885 ||  || — || October 7, 2013 || Kitt Peak || Spacewatch ||  || align=right | 2.7 km || 
|-id=886 bgcolor=#d6d6d6
| 567886 ||  || — || September 13, 2007 || Catalina || CSS ||  || align=right | 3.0 km || 
|-id=887 bgcolor=#d6d6d6
| 567887 ||  || — || November 5, 2002 || Wrightwood || J. W. Young ||  || align=right | 2.1 km || 
|-id=888 bgcolor=#fefefe
| 567888 ||  || — || November 4, 2002 || Palomar || NEAT ||  || align=right data-sort-value="0.73" | 730 m || 
|-id=889 bgcolor=#C2FFFF
| 567889 ||  || — || November 4, 2002 || Kitt Peak || Spacewatch || L5 || align=right | 11 km || 
|-id=890 bgcolor=#fefefe
| 567890 ||  || — || November 11, 2002 || Kitt Peak || Spacewatch ||  || align=right data-sort-value="0.56" | 560 m || 
|-id=891 bgcolor=#E9E9E9
| 567891 ||  || — || November 13, 2002 || Kitt Peak || Spacewatch ||  || align=right | 2.8 km || 
|-id=892 bgcolor=#E9E9E9
| 567892 ||  || — || November 1, 2002 || Palomar || NEAT ||  || align=right | 1.6 km || 
|-id=893 bgcolor=#fefefe
| 567893 ||  || — || May 27, 2012 || Mount Lemmon || Mount Lemmon Survey ||  || align=right data-sort-value="0.57" | 570 m || 
|-id=894 bgcolor=#fefefe
| 567894 ||  || — || December 10, 2009 || Mount Lemmon || Mount Lemmon Survey ||  || align=right data-sort-value="0.57" | 570 m || 
|-id=895 bgcolor=#d6d6d6
| 567895 ||  || — || April 30, 2006 || Kitt Peak || Spacewatch || 7:4 || align=right | 3.1 km || 
|-id=896 bgcolor=#d6d6d6
| 567896 ||  || — || October 11, 2007 || Mount Lemmon || Mount Lemmon Survey ||  || align=right | 1.7 km || 
|-id=897 bgcolor=#fefefe
| 567897 ||  || — || March 12, 2014 || Kitt Peak || Spacewatch ||  || align=right data-sort-value="0.58" | 580 m || 
|-id=898 bgcolor=#d6d6d6
| 567898 ||  || — || November 1, 2002 || La Palma || La Palma Obs. ||  || align=right | 1.6 km || 
|-id=899 bgcolor=#fefefe
| 567899 ||  || — || November 23, 2002 || Palomar || NEAT ||  || align=right data-sort-value="0.79" | 790 m || 
|-id=900 bgcolor=#fefefe
| 567900 ||  || — || November 24, 2002 || Palomar || NEAT || H || align=right data-sort-value="0.54" | 540 m || 
|}

567901–568000 

|-bgcolor=#fefefe
| 567901 ||  || — || November 2, 2015 || Haleakala || Pan-STARRS ||  || align=right data-sort-value="0.60" | 600 m || 
|-id=902 bgcolor=#fefefe
| 567902 ||  || — || November 13, 2002 || Palomar || NEAT ||  || align=right data-sort-value="0.83" | 830 m || 
|-id=903 bgcolor=#d6d6d6
| 567903 ||  || — || November 28, 2002 || Haleakala || AMOS ||  || align=right | 2.3 km || 
|-id=904 bgcolor=#d6d6d6
| 567904 ||  || — || April 18, 2015 || Haleakala || Pan-STARRS ||  || align=right | 2.0 km || 
|-id=905 bgcolor=#d6d6d6
| 567905 ||  || — || November 9, 2007 || Kitt Peak || Spacewatch ||  || align=right | 1.8 km || 
|-id=906 bgcolor=#C2FFFF
| 567906 ||  || — || October 5, 2013 || Haleakala || Pan-STARRS || L5 || align=right | 7.1 km || 
|-id=907 bgcolor=#d6d6d6
| 567907 ||  || — || December 31, 2002 || Socorro || LINEAR ||  || align=right | 2.7 km || 
|-id=908 bgcolor=#d6d6d6
| 567908 ||  || — || December 5, 2002 || Haleakala || AMOS || Tj (2.99) || align=right | 4.3 km || 
|-id=909 bgcolor=#d6d6d6
| 567909 ||  || — || January 10, 2003 || Kitt Peak || Spacewatch ||  || align=right | 2.8 km || 
|-id=910 bgcolor=#d6d6d6
| 567910 ||  || — || January 5, 2003 || Socorro || LINEAR ||  || align=right | 2.9 km || 
|-id=911 bgcolor=#d6d6d6
| 567911 ||  || — || January 26, 2003 || Anderson Mesa || LONEOS ||  || align=right | 2.5 km || 
|-id=912 bgcolor=#d6d6d6
| 567912 ||  || — || January 10, 2003 || Kitt Peak || Spacewatch ||  || align=right | 2.9 km || 
|-id=913 bgcolor=#fefefe
| 567913 ||  || — || January 30, 2003 || Kitt Peak || Spacewatch ||  || align=right data-sort-value="0.75" | 750 m || 
|-id=914 bgcolor=#d6d6d6
| 567914 ||  || — || January 29, 2003 || Palomar || NEAT ||  || align=right | 3.8 km || 
|-id=915 bgcolor=#d6d6d6
| 567915 ||  || — || January 24, 2003 || Palomar || NEAT || EOS || align=right | 2.5 km || 
|-id=916 bgcolor=#d6d6d6
| 567916 ||  || — || December 30, 2007 || Mount Lemmon || Mount Lemmon Survey || EOS || align=right | 1.7 km || 
|-id=917 bgcolor=#d6d6d6
| 567917 ||  || — || January 24, 2003 || Palomar || NEAT ||  || align=right | 3.2 km || 
|-id=918 bgcolor=#d6d6d6
| 567918 ||  || — || May 6, 2014 || Haleakala || Pan-STARRS ||  || align=right | 2.7 km || 
|-id=919 bgcolor=#d6d6d6
| 567919 ||  || — || December 13, 2012 || Mount Lemmon || Mount Lemmon Survey ||  || align=right | 2.1 km || 
|-id=920 bgcolor=#d6d6d6
| 567920 ||  || — || February 26, 2014 || Haleakala || Pan-STARRS ||  || align=right | 2.3 km || 
|-id=921 bgcolor=#d6d6d6
| 567921 ||  || — || April 23, 2015 || Haleakala || Pan-STARRS ||  || align=right | 2.5 km || 
|-id=922 bgcolor=#fefefe
| 567922 ||  || — || October 21, 2008 || Kitt Peak || Spacewatch ||  || align=right data-sort-value="0.63" | 630 m || 
|-id=923 bgcolor=#E9E9E9
| 567923 ||  || — || March 4, 2016 || Haleakala || Pan-STARRS ||  || align=right data-sort-value="0.83" | 830 m || 
|-id=924 bgcolor=#fefefe
| 567924 ||  || — || September 2, 2011 || Haleakala || Pan-STARRS ||  || align=right data-sort-value="0.64" | 640 m || 
|-id=925 bgcolor=#d6d6d6
| 567925 ||  || — || March 7, 2014 || Mount Lemmon || Mount Lemmon Survey ||  || align=right | 2.0 km || 
|-id=926 bgcolor=#d6d6d6
| 567926 ||  || — || May 21, 2015 || Haleakala || Pan-STARRS ||  || align=right | 2.3 km || 
|-id=927 bgcolor=#E9E9E9
| 567927 ||  || — || November 8, 2010 || Kitt Peak || Spacewatch ||  || align=right data-sort-value="0.78" | 780 m || 
|-id=928 bgcolor=#E9E9E9
| 567928 ||  || — || December 6, 2010 || Mount Lemmon || Mount Lemmon Survey ||  || align=right data-sort-value="0.82" | 820 m || 
|-id=929 bgcolor=#E9E9E9
| 567929 ||  || — || May 23, 2012 || Mount Lemmon || Mount Lemmon Survey ||  || align=right | 1.1 km || 
|-id=930 bgcolor=#d6d6d6
| 567930 ||  || — || February 12, 2008 || Mount Lemmon || Mount Lemmon Survey ||  || align=right | 3.2 km || 
|-id=931 bgcolor=#d6d6d6
| 567931 ||  || — || February 2, 2008 || Mount Lemmon || Mount Lemmon Survey ||  || align=right | 2.8 km || 
|-id=932 bgcolor=#d6d6d6
| 567932 ||  || — || February 3, 2008 || Mount Lemmon || Mount Lemmon Survey ||  || align=right | 2.3 km || 
|-id=933 bgcolor=#E9E9E9
| 567933 ||  || — || February 6, 2016 || Haleakala || Pan-STARRS ||  || align=right | 1.8 km || 
|-id=934 bgcolor=#d6d6d6
| 567934 ||  || — || September 4, 2011 || Kitt Peak || Spacewatch ||  || align=right | 2.1 km || 
|-id=935 bgcolor=#E9E9E9
| 567935 ||  || — || December 23, 2014 || Mount Lemmon || Mount Lemmon Survey ||  || align=right | 1.5 km || 
|-id=936 bgcolor=#d6d6d6
| 567936 ||  || — || January 27, 2003 || Socorro || LINEAR ||  || align=right | 2.5 km || 
|-id=937 bgcolor=#d6d6d6
| 567937 ||  || — || February 9, 2003 || La Silla || R. Michelsen, G. Masi ||  || align=right | 2.2 km || 
|-id=938 bgcolor=#d6d6d6
| 567938 ||  || — || February 4, 2003 || La Silla ||  ||  || align=right | 2.3 km || 
|-id=939 bgcolor=#fefefe
| 567939 ||  || — || June 14, 2004 || Kitt Peak || Spacewatch ||  || align=right data-sort-value="0.66" | 660 m || 
|-id=940 bgcolor=#fefefe
| 567940 ||  || — || September 29, 2008 || Mount Lemmon || Mount Lemmon Survey ||  || align=right data-sort-value="0.79" | 790 m || 
|-id=941 bgcolor=#d6d6d6
| 567941 ||  || — || March 29, 2004 || Kitt Peak || I. dell'Antonio ||  || align=right | 2.2 km || 
|-id=942 bgcolor=#d6d6d6
| 567942 ||  || — || November 18, 2007 || Mount Lemmon || Mount Lemmon Survey ||  || align=right | 2.2 km || 
|-id=943 bgcolor=#E9E9E9
| 567943 ||  || — || February 1, 2003 || Palomar || NEAT ||  || align=right | 2.4 km || 
|-id=944 bgcolor=#d6d6d6
| 567944 ||  || — || February 12, 2003 || Haleakala || AMOS || TIR || align=right | 3.1 km || 
|-id=945 bgcolor=#E9E9E9
| 567945 ||  || — || January 27, 2003 || Socorro || LINEAR ||  || align=right | 2.2 km || 
|-id=946 bgcolor=#E9E9E9
| 567946 ||  || — || January 30, 2003 || Haleakala || AMOS ||  || align=right | 1.8 km || 
|-id=947 bgcolor=#d6d6d6
| 567947 ||  || — || November 16, 2012 || Charleston || R. Holmes ||  || align=right | 2.8 km || 
|-id=948 bgcolor=#d6d6d6
| 567948 ||  || — || March 7, 2003 || Socorro || LINEAR || Tj (2.97) || align=right | 2.4 km || 
|-id=949 bgcolor=#E9E9E9
| 567949 ||  || — || March 9, 2003 || Palomar || NEAT ||  || align=right | 1.8 km || 
|-id=950 bgcolor=#E9E9E9
| 567950 ||  || — || March 9, 2003 || Palomar || NEAT ||  || align=right | 1.7 km || 
|-id=951 bgcolor=#E9E9E9
| 567951 ||  || — || March 11, 2003 || Kitt Peak || Spacewatch ||  || align=right | 1.3 km || 
|-id=952 bgcolor=#E9E9E9
| 567952 ||  || — || December 13, 2010 || Mauna Kea || L. Wells, M. Micheli ||  || align=right | 1.5 km || 
|-id=953 bgcolor=#E9E9E9
| 567953 ||  || — || August 6, 2004 || Palomar || NEAT ||  || align=right | 1.1 km || 
|-id=954 bgcolor=#d6d6d6
| 567954 ||  || — || September 4, 2011 || Haleakala || Pan-STARRS ||  || align=right | 2.8 km || 
|-id=955 bgcolor=#E9E9E9
| 567955 ||  || — || December 3, 2010 || Kitt Peak || Spacewatch ||  || align=right | 1.7 km || 
|-id=956 bgcolor=#d6d6d6
| 567956 ||  || — || August 9, 2016 || Haleakala || Pan-STARRS ||  || align=right | 2.5 km || 
|-id=957 bgcolor=#d6d6d6
| 567957 ||  || — || March 23, 2003 || Kitt Peak || Spacewatch ||  || align=right | 2.8 km || 
|-id=958 bgcolor=#fefefe
| 567958 ||  || — || March 24, 2003 || Kitt Peak || Spacewatch ||  || align=right data-sort-value="0.73" | 730 m || 
|-id=959 bgcolor=#E9E9E9
| 567959 ||  || — || March 26, 2003 || Socorro || LINEAR ||  || align=right | 1.7 km || 
|-id=960 bgcolor=#d6d6d6
| 567960 ||  || — || March 11, 2003 || Palomar || NEAT ||  || align=right | 3.2 km || 
|-id=961 bgcolor=#E9E9E9
| 567961 ||  || — || March 26, 2003 || Palomar || NEAT ||  || align=right | 1.8 km || 
|-id=962 bgcolor=#E9E9E9
| 567962 ||  || — || March 11, 2003 || Kitt Peak || Spacewatch ||  || align=right | 1.3 km || 
|-id=963 bgcolor=#fefefe
| 567963 ||  || — || March 26, 2003 || Palomar || NEAT ||  || align=right | 1.0 km || 
|-id=964 bgcolor=#E9E9E9
| 567964 ||  || — || March 31, 2003 || Anderson Mesa || LONEOS ||  || align=right | 1.5 km || 
|-id=965 bgcolor=#d6d6d6
| 567965 ||  || — || March 31, 2003 || Kitt Peak || Spacewatch ||  || align=right | 2.7 km || 
|-id=966 bgcolor=#d6d6d6
| 567966 ||  || — || March 30, 2003 || Kitt Peak || M. W. Buie, A. B. Jordan ||  || align=right | 2.4 km || 
|-id=967 bgcolor=#fefefe
| 567967 ||  || — || March 30, 2003 || Kitt Peak || M. W. Buie, A. B. Jordan ||  || align=right data-sort-value="0.59" | 590 m || 
|-id=968 bgcolor=#E9E9E9
| 567968 ||  || — || March 30, 2003 || Kitt Peak || M. W. Buie, A. B. Jordan ||  || align=right | 1.1 km || 
|-id=969 bgcolor=#d6d6d6
| 567969 ||  || — || March 23, 2003 || Kitt Peak || Spacewatch ||  || align=right | 2.3 km || 
|-id=970 bgcolor=#d6d6d6
| 567970 ||  || — || March 27, 2003 || Palomar || NEAT ||  || align=right | 3.2 km || 
|-id=971 bgcolor=#d6d6d6
| 567971 ||  || — || August 31, 2011 || Haleakala || Pan-STARRS ||  || align=right | 2.8 km || 
|-id=972 bgcolor=#fefefe
| 567972 ||  || — || September 4, 2011 || Haleakala || Pan-STARRS ||  || align=right data-sort-value="0.92" | 920 m || 
|-id=973 bgcolor=#fefefe
| 567973 ||  || — || February 19, 2010 || Mount Lemmon || Mount Lemmon Survey ||  || align=right data-sort-value="0.65" | 650 m || 
|-id=974 bgcolor=#E9E9E9
| 567974 ||  || — || March 26, 2003 || Kitt Peak || Spacewatch ||  || align=right | 1.7 km || 
|-id=975 bgcolor=#E9E9E9
| 567975 ||  || — || August 27, 2014 || Haleakala || Pan-STARRS ||  || align=right | 1.2 km || 
|-id=976 bgcolor=#E9E9E9
| 567976 ||  || — || November 29, 2014 || Mount Lemmon || Mount Lemmon Survey ||  || align=right | 1.1 km || 
|-id=977 bgcolor=#d6d6d6
| 567977 ||  || — || May 3, 2014 || Mount Lemmon || Mount Lemmon Survey ||  || align=right | 2.6 km || 
|-id=978 bgcolor=#d6d6d6
| 567978 ||  || — || January 11, 2008 || Kitt Peak || Spacewatch ||  || align=right | 2.2 km || 
|-id=979 bgcolor=#E9E9E9
| 567979 ||  || — || March 31, 2003 || Kitt Peak || Spacewatch ||  || align=right | 1.5 km || 
|-id=980 bgcolor=#fefefe
| 567980 ||  || — || March 26, 2003 || Palomar || NEAT ||  || align=right data-sort-value="0.53" | 530 m || 
|-id=981 bgcolor=#d6d6d6
| 567981 ||  || — || October 22, 2005 || Kitt Peak || Spacewatch ||  || align=right | 2.9 km || 
|-id=982 bgcolor=#d6d6d6
| 567982 ||  || — || December 16, 2007 || Mount Lemmon || Mount Lemmon Survey ||  || align=right | 2.7 km || 
|-id=983 bgcolor=#fefefe
| 567983 ||  || — || July 30, 2008 || Kitt Peak || Spacewatch ||  || align=right data-sort-value="0.75" | 750 m || 
|-id=984 bgcolor=#d6d6d6
| 567984 ||  || — || October 27, 2006 || Mount Lemmon || Mount Lemmon Survey ||  || align=right | 2.3 km || 
|-id=985 bgcolor=#d6d6d6
| 567985 ||  || — || December 4, 2007 || Mount Lemmon || Mount Lemmon Survey ||  || align=right | 2.6 km || 
|-id=986 bgcolor=#d6d6d6
| 567986 ||  || — || October 21, 2006 || Kitt Peak || Spacewatch ||  || align=right | 2.5 km || 
|-id=987 bgcolor=#E9E9E9
| 567987 ||  || — || March 13, 2011 || Mount Lemmon || Mount Lemmon Survey ||  || align=right data-sort-value="0.91" | 910 m || 
|-id=988 bgcolor=#d6d6d6
| 567988 ||  || — || May 22, 2015 || Haleakala || Pan-STARRS ||  || align=right | 2.6 km || 
|-id=989 bgcolor=#d6d6d6
| 567989 ||  || — || March 23, 2003 || Kitt Peak || Spacewatch ||  || align=right | 2.4 km || 
|-id=990 bgcolor=#d6d6d6
| 567990 ||  || — || January 11, 2008 || Kitt Peak || Spacewatch ||  || align=right | 1.9 km || 
|-id=991 bgcolor=#d6d6d6
| 567991 ||  || — || January 10, 2007 || Mount Lemmon || Mount Lemmon Survey ||  || align=right | 2.6 km || 
|-id=992 bgcolor=#fefefe
| 567992 ||  || — || April 4, 2003 || Kitt Peak || Spacewatch ||  || align=right data-sort-value="0.71" | 710 m || 
|-id=993 bgcolor=#d6d6d6
| 567993 ||  || — || April 4, 2003 || Kitt Peak || Spacewatch ||  || align=right | 3.2 km || 
|-id=994 bgcolor=#d6d6d6
| 567994 ||  || — || April 7, 2003 || Kitt Peak || Spacewatch ||  || align=right | 2.3 km || 
|-id=995 bgcolor=#E9E9E9
| 567995 ||  || — || April 5, 2003 || Kitt Peak || Spacewatch ||  || align=right | 1.6 km || 
|-id=996 bgcolor=#d6d6d6
| 567996 ||  || — || January 30, 2008 || Mount Lemmon || Mount Lemmon Survey ||  || align=right | 2.9 km || 
|-id=997 bgcolor=#fefefe
| 567997 ||  || — || January 31, 2006 || Kitt Peak || Spacewatch ||  || align=right data-sort-value="0.61" | 610 m || 
|-id=998 bgcolor=#d6d6d6
| 567998 ||  || — || September 8, 2011 || Kitt Peak || Spacewatch ||  || align=right | 3.2 km || 
|-id=999 bgcolor=#d6d6d6
| 567999 ||  || — || December 31, 2007 || Kitt Peak || Spacewatch ||  || align=right | 2.5 km || 
|-id=000 bgcolor=#fefefe
| 568000 ||  || — || April 5, 2003 || Kitt Peak || Spacewatch ||  || align=right data-sort-value="0.65" | 650 m || 
|}

References

External links 
 Discovery Circumstances: Numbered Minor Planets (565001)–(570000) (IAU Minor Planet Center)

0567